= Machin series =

Stamp series

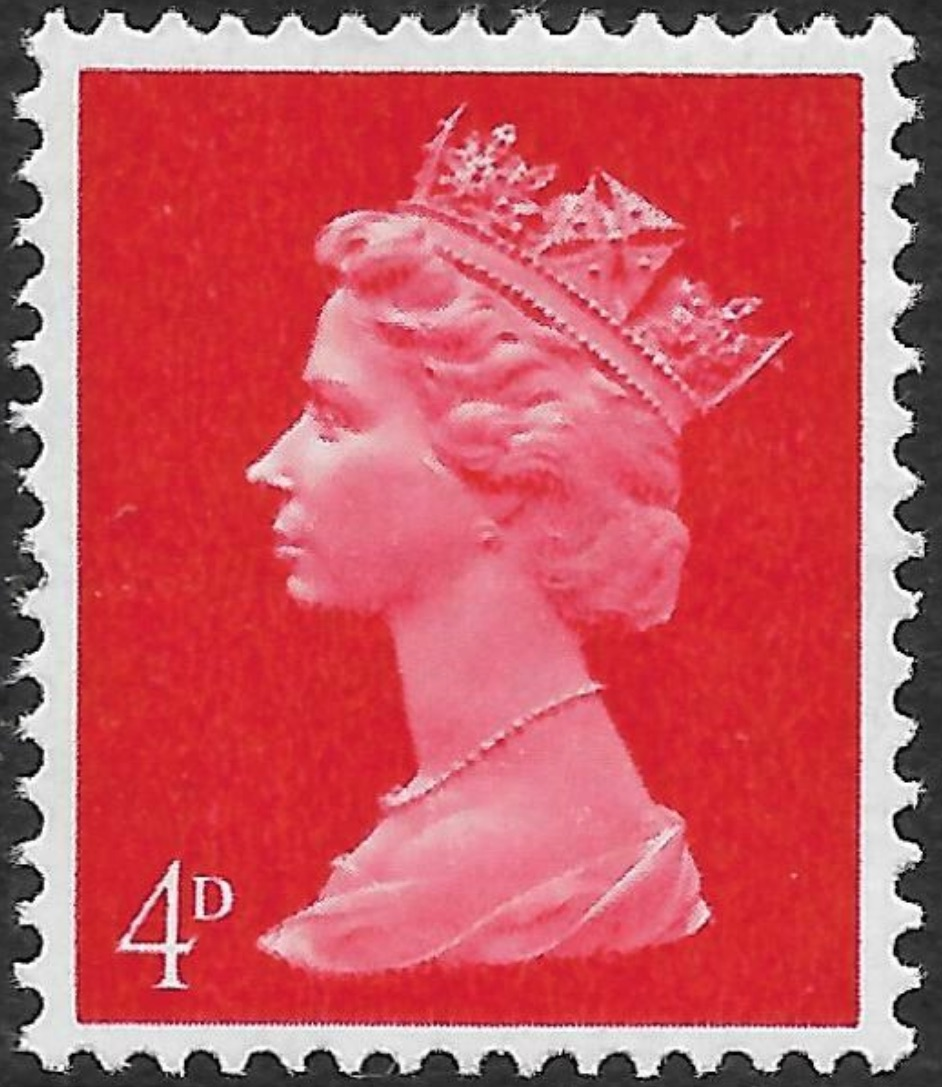
The 4d bright vermilion of 1969 replaced the dark-coloured 4d of the original 1967 issue.

The Machin series /ˈmeɪtʃɪn/ of postage stamps was the main definitive stamp series in the United Kingdom for most of the reign of Elizabeth II, from 1967 until her death in 2022. Introduced on 5 June 1967, it was the second series of her reign, replacing the Wilding series. The last issue was on 4 April 2022, four months before the Queen's death on 8 September.

Designed by Arnold Machin, the stamps consist simply of the sculpted profile of the Queen and a denomination, and are almost always in a single colour.

After five decades of service, the series has encompassed almost all changes and innovations in British stamp printing. This has encouraged an abundant specialised philatelic collectors' market and associated literature.

Arnold Machin's 1964 effigy of Elizabeth II was replaced on British coins in 1984 by an older-looking portrayal by Raphael Maklouf. However, the Queen's likeness on British definitive stamps was not replaced after 1967, and she herself rejected the last proposals to replace them.

== Genesis ==
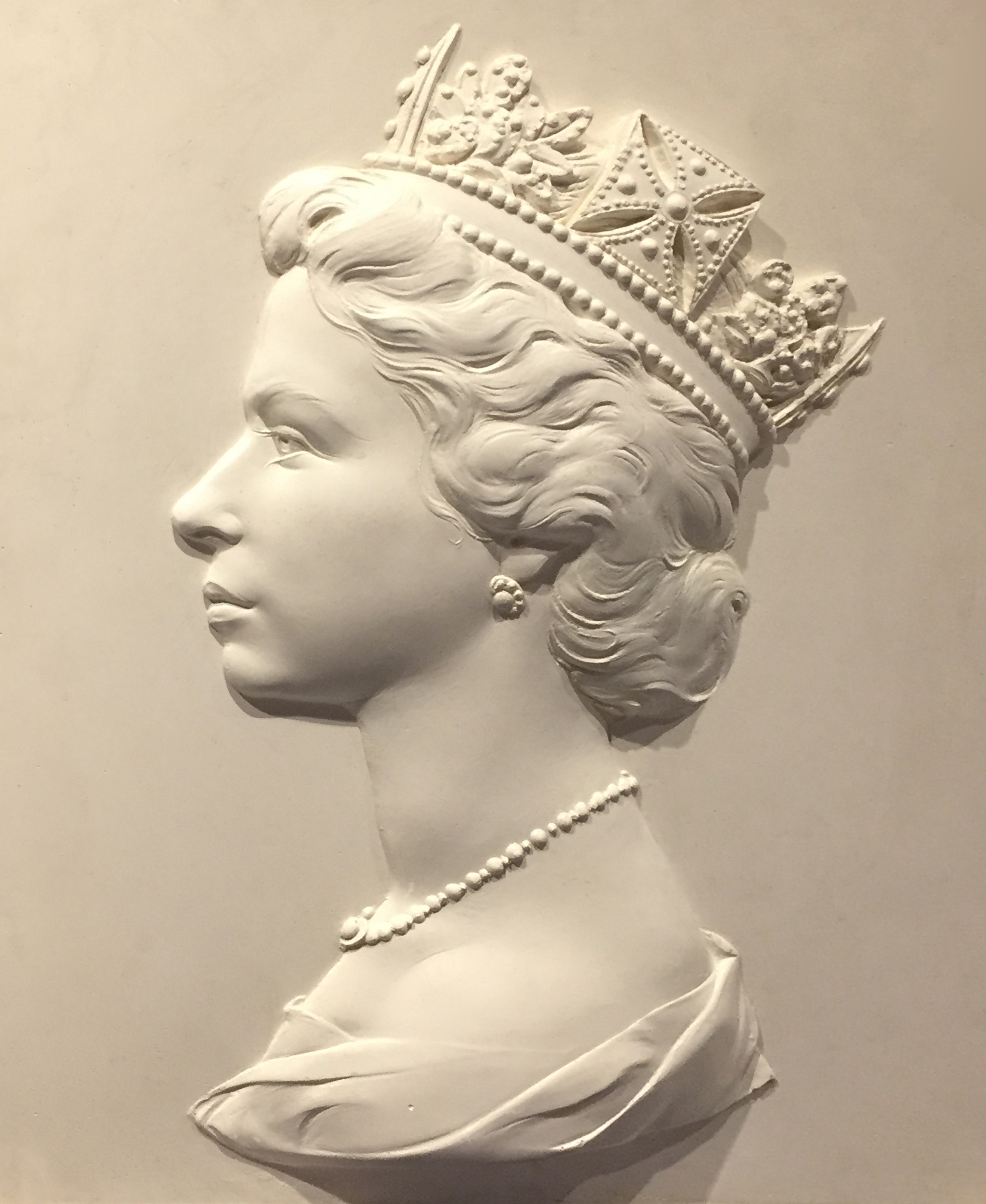
The original sculpture

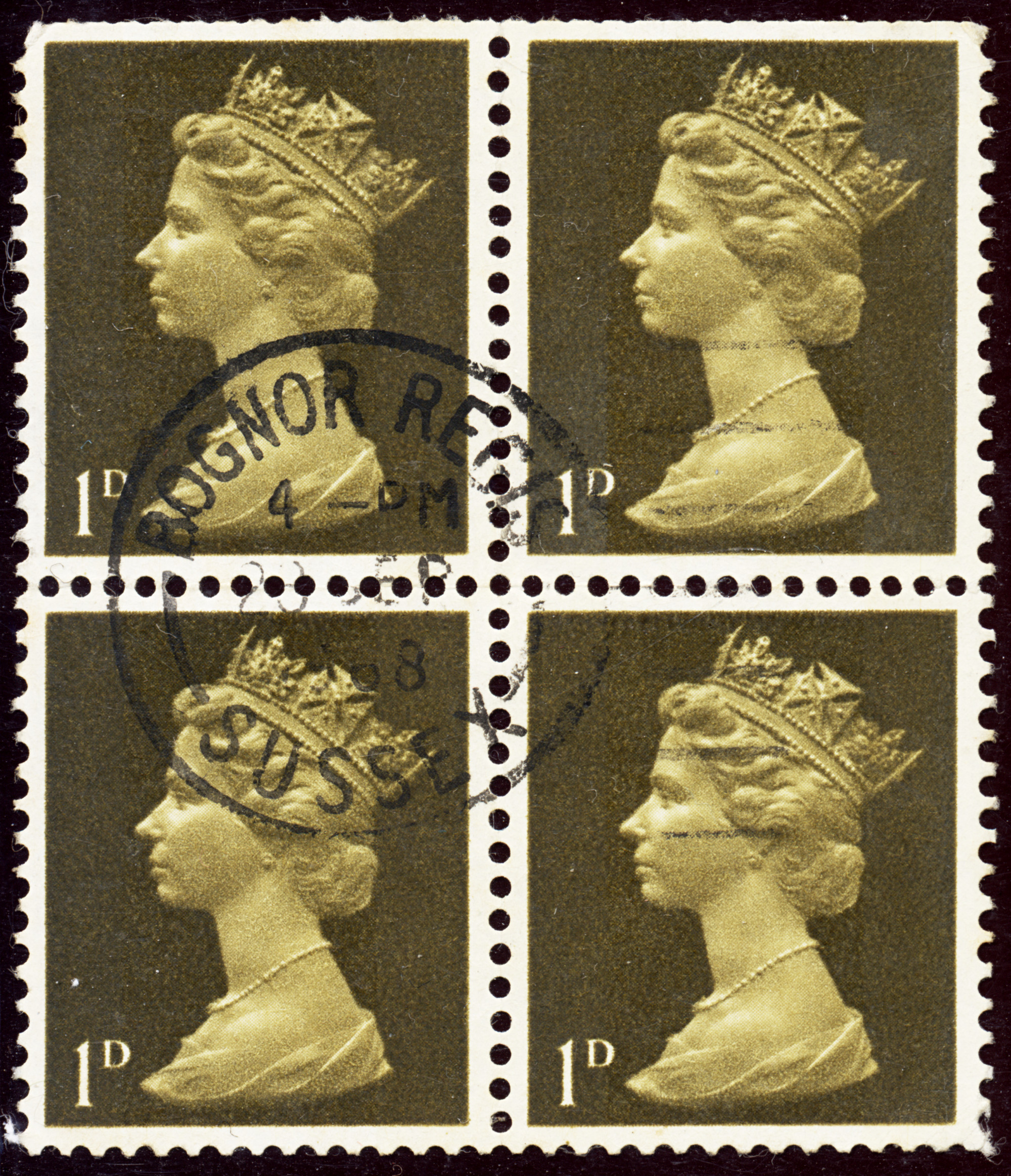
Used block of four 1d stamps of the 1967 issue

Since the accession of Elizabeth II in 1952, the definitive series figured a three-quarter photograph of the Queen by Dorothy Wilding. The same effigy had also appeared on commemorative stamps. However, the Wilding design did not please some artists. In a letter of April 1961, Michael Goaman and Faith Jacques argued that it represented the Queen, but not the monarchy. They complained it embarrassed the commemorative stamps' designers because the photograph took up one third of the stamp's area and it imposed a perspective on a two-dimensional design.

Some new designs were discussed but concerns over the technical aspects (a photograph or a painting inspired by a photograph) delayed a full competition for artists until 1965. Postmaster General Tony Benn and artist David Gentleman failed in their attempts to have the royal head replaced by the name of the country ("Great Britain" or "U.K."), but were permitted to explore temporary solutions to the commemorative head problems. This would have removed the unique position of the United Kingdom as the only modern issuer of postage stamps not to have its country name on its stamps, this being because of it being the original creator of the adhesive postage stamp in 1840. In 1966 Gentleman created a small single-coloured profile from a coin by Mary Gillick. The project waited until the miniaturisation of the new definitive effigy that the Stamp Advisory Committee (SAC), on 13 January 1965, had advised the Postmaster General be chosen, from profiles and engraved images based on a photograph.

The first essays were submitted by Andrew Restall and Arnold Machin with Harrison and Sons printers' assistance. They worked from photographs by Anthony Buckley, then from ones by Lord Snowdon, the Queen's brother-in-law. Machin had just finished work on the new coin's effigy based on the photographer's pictures. The competition began with more artists officially invited during Summer 1965, but at a meeting on 26 January 1966, the SAC's members decided to let only Gentleman and Machin continue work on the design.

Machin's method was to sculpt a bas-relief in clay and moulds, which he reworked and corrected depending on what the SAC required. The printing essays were then done by Harrisons & Sons from photographs of the sculpture, completed with the additions and adornments by Machin. Quickly, he decided to simplify the effigy with just the Queen wearing the Diamond Diadem and its bouquets of national flower emblems, like the Wilding series. Yet these flowers were also dropped: Machin's design would eventually have only the Queen's profile and the value of the stamp.

In March 1966, the Stamp Advisory Committee decided to make new photographs of the Queen available to Gentleman and Machin. They were taken by John Hedgecoe on the following 22 June. Elizabeth II selected the pictures to be given to the artists and Gentleman continued work on the "photographic alternative" to Machin's sculpture.

During the second period of 1966, Machin replaced the tiara with the George IV State Diadem on request of the SAC, the same diadem as was previously seen on the Penny Black. The Queen asked for a corsage at the bottom of her sculpted neck. The final sculpture is a rectangle of plaster, 16 inches long and 14 inches wide.

The last adjustments to the final plaster image and to the lighting during photography created four effigies. They were unveiled to philatelists on the pre-decimal stamps, the first ones issued 5 June 1967.

Concerning the original colours, Machin encouraged the use of a clearer effigy on a single-coloured background. The 4 pence ("4d") was given a very dark brown, inspired by the Penny Black and requested by the Queen herself. But the Post Office did not fully respect Machin's views and in the first years of the series would also issue bi-coloured stamps and clear-to-dark graduated backgrounds.

== Evolutions ==
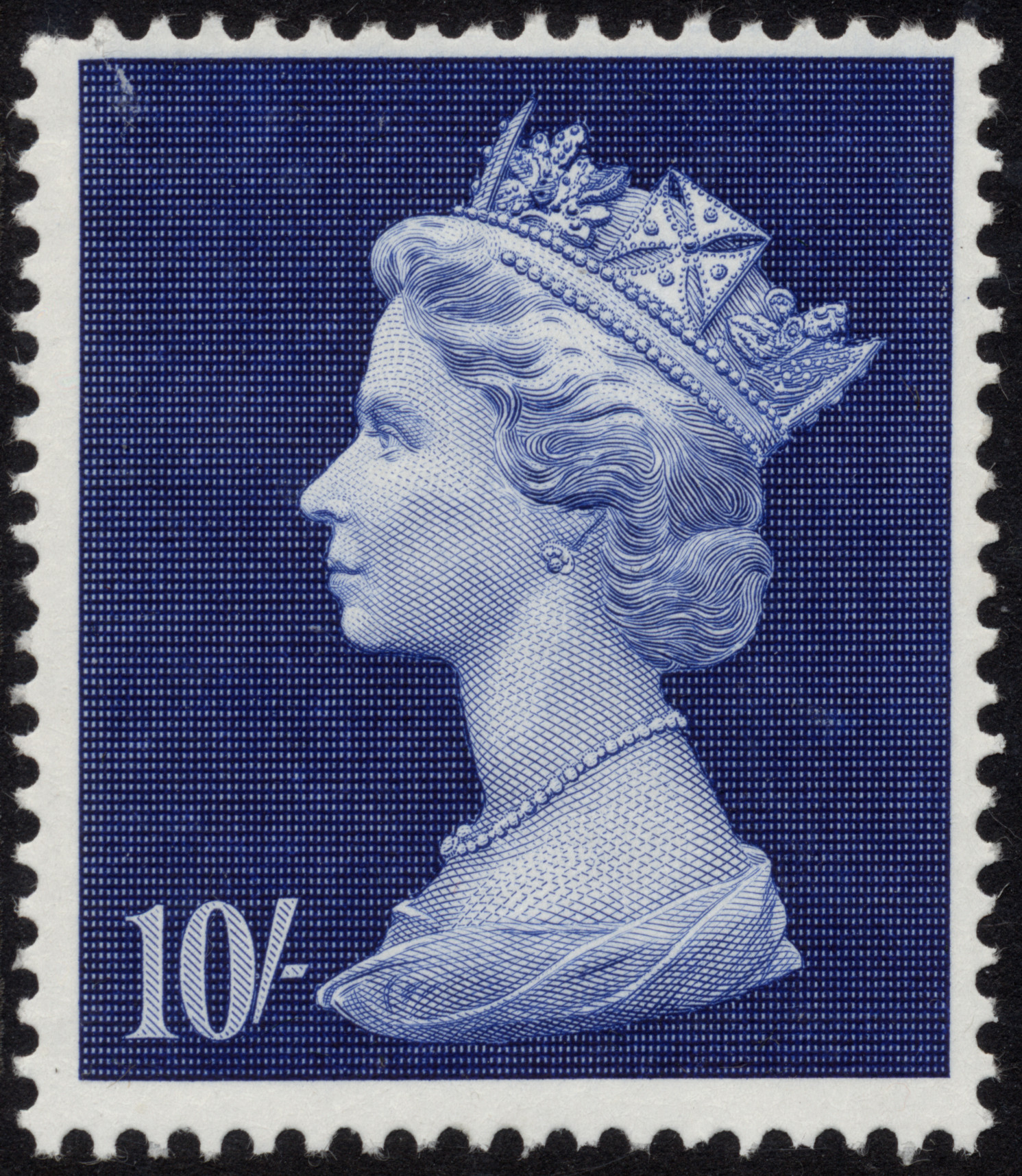
First issue large size Machin of 10/- (1969)

From the philatelic point of view, the "Machins" are far more complex than the simple design might at first suggest, with well over five thousand varieties of colour, value, gum, phosphor banding, iridescent overprints, perforations, printing methods (Photogravure, Intaglio (Engraved), Typography, Electro-Mechanical Engraving (EME Gravure), Embossing) etc., known. Since the first stamps were issued pre-decimalisation, they exist in both old and new currencies. As postal rates changed, new denominations became necessary: the design was adjusted periodically, for instance to use a gradated shade in the background; perforations were changed; and so forth. In addition, for the regional or "Country" stamps of 1971, the regions' symbols, designed by Jeffery Matthews, were added to the basic design.

Initially the stamps were produced by Harrison & Sons using photogravure, with the high-value designs being larger and engraved (intaglio) by Bradbury Wilkinson and Company. Starting around 1980, The House of Questa and Waddingtons Security Print also took up Machin printing in order to keep up with demand, producing their versions via lithography.

Apart from the many values of normal-sized stamps, there have been two different formats used for "high-value" definitives. In 1969 a larger and more square format was used to issue stamps of 2/6, 5/-, 10/- and £1 face value, and was used again in 1970 for the decimal currency values of 10p, 20p and 50p. (The £1 stamp had the lettering re-designed in 1972 and was re-issued. This version is usually seen as a 'decimal' edition as opposed to a 'pre-decimal' stamp.) In 1977 a taller portrait format was used for the large £1, £2, and £5 stamps, and also at various times between 1983 and 1987 for the odd values of £1.30, £1.33, £1.41, £1.50 and £1.60. These values were withdrawn after the introduction of the "Castles" high-value stamps of 1988.

The Castles stamps were the first in the reign of Elizabeth II to use a digit "1". All previous stamps of her reign had used a capital "I" instead. All Machin stamps continue to use "I" apart from the large 1st class introduced in 2006.

In 1989, as a workaround to the problem of fast-changing rates, "non-value indicator" Machins used textual inscriptions "1st" and "2nd" to indicate class of service rather than a numeric value. The following year of 1990 brought forth the first commemorative adaptation of the Machin design, with the classic William Wyon profile of Queen Victoria, Queen Elizabeth II's Great-Great Grandmother, appearing behind and to the left of Elizabeth, marking 150 years of British stamps, namely the Penny Black 1d stamp of 1840. These are sometimes called "Double-Head Machins".

1993 saw the introduction of both self-adhesive stamps and elliptical perforations on the lower vertical sides of the Machins, the latter as a security measure.

On the high value stamps, an iridescent ink by the brand name of "Iriodin" was used to give them a shiny, pearlescent appearance and ensure the difficulty of their reproduction by photocopying.

Postally used Machins showing ellipsoidal shear panels.

In February 2009, security features were increased on "Machin" self-adhesive stamps to avoid the reuse of uncancelled used stamps retrieved on mail. Both the effigy and the background were printed with continuous "ROYAL MAIL" iridescent printing. Two ellipsoidal shear panels were added to each stamp, and the water-soluble layer between the stamp and the adhesive was abandoned. These two later features were intended to render the stamps difficult to take off mail and to store for reuse (but in effect are easily overcome by the careful use of a sharp knife edge). Collectors are advised not to attempt to soak such stamps off, but to save them on pieces cut from the envelope.

The security features also included a minute change to the background printing of "ROYAL MAIL" where one letter is replaced to identify the source of the stamp. For example, instead of "ROYAL MAIL" in one place in the upper right of the stamp is printed "FOYAL MAIL" to indicate that that stamp came from a booklet of four stamps. This feature made it easier to identify the source of an individual used stamp and track down production problems. The codes evolved further in the year 2010 when a year code was included as well; for instance M11L means that the stamp was printed in 2011. The source codes are as follows: MBIL – from Business Sheets, MCIL – from Custom Retail Books with four Machins and two Special or Commemorative Stamps, MFIL – from Books of Four, MPIL – from Prestige Books, MRIL – from Coil Stamps in Rolls, MSIL – from Books of Six, MTIL – From Books of Twelve, and no source codes at all for Machin Stamps from Counter Sheets, though these do carry year codes.

In 2016, yet another security feature arose in that the backing paper for all of the Machin self-adhesive stamps had a security background printing in grey of "ROYAL MAIL", repeated (there are 3 types of this SBC or "Security Backing Paper") in yet another attempt at thwarting forgeries, these seeming to be an ongoing problem.

== Colours ==
The most striking aspect of the Machins is the rainbow of colours. Since the designs are all identical (or nearly so), it was critical that each denomination be produced in an easily distinguished colour. Worse, the likelihood of rate changes meant that additional colours would be necessary, since old stamps were still valid and could appear on mail.

The initial palette of 14 colours was chosen after extensive testing. While most were solid colours, the 1/6d and 1/9d used different colours for effigy and denomination, while the 10d and 1/- had backgrounds that varied from darker on the left side to lighter on the right. The dark olive-brown shade of the 4d value, the most often-used stamp of the time, was personally selected by the Queen as being the available colour most reminiscent of the Penny Black. However, in practice this proved difficult to distinguish from the 5d's dark blue, automated machinery could not always see the phosphor bands on the stamps, and even football pool organizers complained that it was too hard to read the date and time of cancellations. In 1969, the 4d value was changed to vermilion, which in turn required a colour change for the 8d, which was reissued in "eggshell blue".

In preparation for decimalisation in 1971, the GPO prepared a new palette of colours, enlisting the Applied Psychology Unit of Cambridge University to test individuals' abilities to quickly identify colours. The results pruned a selection of 25 down to the 14 used for the decimal stamps.

During the 1970s a third effigy/ background colour format emerged in addition to the existing light head-dark background and the light head-graded background; the new variation consisted of the head the same colour as the background, with just the shaded detail picking out the image. (In more recent years the light head-dark background has become near universal.)

Over the years, rate changes required new denominations, and in order to make colours available, older stamps had to be withdrawn. For instance, the 11p rose of 1976 was withdrawn in 1980, and the colour reused in 1983 for a 23p stamp. A re-introduced denomination could not normally get its old colour back though; the light green 17p of 1980 was withdrawn in 1981, reissued in steel blue in 1983, withdrawn 1986, and reappeared yet again in 1990, this time in dark blue.

In 1983, Aubrey Walker of the Royal Mail's R&D department proposed a fixed assignment of colours to rates, on the theory that the classes of service changed much less frequently than rates. This still did not solve the problem of clerks detecting usage of old stamps with lower rates – they would have had to read the denomination rather than just glance at the colour – and so a system of "light" and "dark" colours was suggested, the two variants alternating at each rate change. Artist Jeffery Matthews was then hired to develop the actual colours, and in 1985 presented eight pairs totalling 16 colours. The colour pairing idea turned out to be unworkable, but the colours were adopted, and in 1988 Matthews developed another 15 as rates continued to be changed.

== Machin head replacement ==
On three occasions, postal sources have confirmed that a replacement for the Machin series was proposed by the Post Office, and its successor, the Royal Mail. However, the Queen subsequently rejected the proposed designs.

In March 1981, after Raphael Maklouf's effigy was chosen to appear on new-issue coinage, a proposal was made to replace Machin's effigy by 1983, in time for the 30th anniversary of the Queens's coronation. The Post Office's Ron Dearing obtained agreement from the Queen, even if she expressed through a letter by her deputy private secretary that "Her Majesty is very content with the Machin effigy and thinks that a work of real quality is required if this is to be replaced."

Under the supervision of Post Office design adviser Barry Robinson, Jeffery Matthews prepared alternative essays from March 1982 pictures of the Queen by Lord Snowdon. Matthews used many different positions of the head and shoulders, from profile to full-face. Essays with the latter position were designed from the photographic representation and from a portrait drawn by his son Rory Matthews. In 1983, Robinson ordered new portraits by different artists: drawn by John Sargeant, painted by Timothy Whidborne and Brian Sanders, later engraved by Czesław Słania in 1984. Harrison and Sons printed these essays. However, they failed to please the Stamp Advisory Committee.

In June 1985, a new working group proposed a change to the original Machin stamp design. It comprised a bicoloured (grey effigy on a coloured background); Jeffery Matthews then worked on a different cut of the shoulders and neck, for a horizontal stamp. As Arnold Machin had to be informed on any modifications of his original design, Barry Robinson and Jeffery Matthews visited him on 23 October 1985. Machin refused any changes by anyone except himself and didn't appreciate being approached after the proposed changes were finalised.

Following the abandonment of all of the proposed changes during the 1980s, some of Jeffery Matthews's designs were later used: the horizontal format served for the first self-adhesive stamps in 1993 and for the "higher rate" stamps of 2006.

Another attempt to alter the design was proposed on the occasion of the 150th anniversary of the Penny Black in 1990. The Queen's decision not to agree to any changes swiftly ended the move.

== Ever-changing Machins ==
From the initial Harrison printings through to the present, there has always been a wealth of study material for the Machin collector of any level. The fact that printers and printing methods change so frequently means that collecting Machin stamps remains popular. As is usual with a new printer, such as happened when Enschede, Waddington, Questa and Walsall were engaged, subtle changes occur, giving rise to new varieties. The latest printer to be awarded considerable printing contracts for Machins is Cartor. Cartor, however, has given collectors a new strand of Machin types from its Prestige Booklet panes and later mini-sheets, to expand collections even more.

=== Machin series' Golden Anniversary, 2017 ===
On 5 June 2017, the Machin series celebrated its 50th year, or Golden Anniversary. To honour this series, Royal Mail went to great lengths to supply a plethora of new Machins for this much collected series. Two miniature souvenir sheets were issued with one of the stamps on the second sheet printed in the larger sized stamp format of 1970, and printed in 22kt gold foil and embossed. A five-pane prestige book was issued for the 50th Anniversary of the Machin series with one of the five panes printed in 22kt gold foil and embossed as a block of four. A counter booklet of 1st class Machins showed a photo of Arnold Machin at work sculpting the Machin Effigy. A group of 6 Machin Faststamps was issued and with some pre-decimal colours. Several first day of issue covers, including one with a specially made medallion coin cover with the Machin stamp effigy on one side, and the Machin coin effigy on the other.

=== Prestige Booklet Panes ===
There has been a series of Prestige Booklet Panes produced since the first "Wedgwood" prestige booklet of 16 April 1980 starting with the "Stanley Gibbons" issue of 19 May 1982, consisting of a 3-square panel of 9 stamps or 8 stamps with a central non-value label. Initially prestige booklets consisted of several panes of Machin stamps, plus several pages of narrative and pictures on the booklet's theme. Over time panes of commemorative stamps related to the theme began to be included. In recent years the stamps in prestige booklets contain primarily commemorative issues and only one pane of Machin stamps. They were originally given the Stanley Gibbons designation "DX", and then the designation "DY" from 2011, and are:

Designation	Description	Date
DX1	£1 Wedgwood	18 April 1980
DX2	£3 Wedgwood	18 April 1980
DX3	Stanley Gibbons	19 May 1982
DX4	Royal Mint	14 September 1983
DX5	Christian Heritage	4 September 1984
DX6	The Times	8 January 1985
DX7	British Rail	18 March 1986
DX8	P&O	3 March 1987
DX9	Financial Times	9 February 1988
DX10	Scots Connection	20 March 1989
DX11a	London Life	20 March 1990
DX11b	The Penny Black	6 May 1990
DX12	Agatha Christie	19 March 1991
DX13	Wales	25 February 1992
DX14	Tolkien	27 October 1992
DX15	Beatrix Potter	10 August 1993
DX16	Northern Ireland	26 July 1994
DX17	National Trust	23 April 1995
DX18	European Football	14 May 1996
DX19	BBC	23 September 1997
DX20	Definitive Portrait	10 March 1998
DX21	Breaking Barriers	13 October 1998
DX22a	Profile on Print (8)	16 February 1999
DX22b	Profile on Print (9)	16 February 1999
DX23	World Changers	21 September 1999
DX24a	Special by Design(8)	13 February 2000
DX24b	Special by Design(9)	13 February 2000
DX25a	Queen Mother (Machin)	4 August 2000
DX25b	Queen Mother (regional)	4 August 2000
DX26	Treasury of Trees	18 September 2000
DX27	Flags and Ensigns	23 October 2001
DX28a	Golden Jubilee (Machin)	6 February 2002
DX28b	Golden Jubilee (Wilding)	6 February 2002
DX29	Astronomy	24 September 2002
DX30	The Secret of Life	25 February 2003
DX31	Coronation	2 June 2003
DX32	Letters by Night	16 March 2004
DX33	R H S	25 May 2004
DX34	Charlotte Brontë	24 February 2005
DX35	Trafalgar	18 October 2005
DX36	Brunel	23 February 2006
DX37	Victoria Cross	21 September 2006
DX38	World of Invention	1 March 2007
DX39	Machin	5 June 2007
DX40	Army Uniforms	20 September 2007
DX41	James Bond	6 January 2008
DX42	RAF Uniforms	18 September 2008
DX43	Regionals	29 September 2008
DX44	Design Classics	13 January 2009
DX45	Darwin	12 February 2009
DX46a	Treasures of the Archive	18 August 2009
DX46b	Treasures of the Archive	18 August 2009
DX47	Royal Navy Uniforms	17 September 2009
DX48a	Classic Album Covers	7 January 2010
DX48b	Classic Album Covers	7 January 2010
DX49	The Royal Society	25 February 2010
DX50a	King George V	6 May 2010
DX50b	Festival of Stamps	8 May 2010
DX51	Britain Alone	13 May 2010
DX52	WWF	23 April 2011
DY1	Morris & Co	5 May 2011
DY2	Aerial Post Centennial	9 Sept 2011
DY3	Roald Dahl	10 January 2012
DY4	Diamond Jubilee	31 May 2012
DY5	Olympics	2012
DY6	Dr. Who	26 March 2013
DY7	Football Heroes	9 May 2013
DY8	Merchant Navy	19 September 2013
DY9	Locomotives	2014
DY10	Buckingham Palace	2014
DY11	Great War 1914	2014
DY12	Inventive Britain	2014
DY13	Great War 1915	2015
DY14	Waterloo	2015
DY15	Star Wars I	2015
DY16	Royal Mail 500	2015
DY17	Queen's 90th	2016
DY18	Great War 1916	2016
DY19	Beatrix Potter II	2016
DY20	Windsor Castle	2016
DY21	Machin 50th	2017
DY22	Great War 1917	2017
DY23	Star Wars II	2017
DY24	Game of Thrones	2018
DY25	RAF Anniversary	2018
DY26	Great War 1918	2018
DY27	Harry Potter Wizarding World	2018
DY28	Leonardo da Vinci	2019
DY29	Make mine Marvel	2019
DY30	Queen Victoria	2019
DY31	Star Wars – The making of the Vehicles	2019
DY32	Vision of the Universe	2020
DY33	Behind the scenes of James Bond	2020
DY34	The End of the Second World War	2020

=== The wrong typeface ===
All printers have in recent years been given a technical brief on printing Machin stamps from Royal Mail and Cartor would have had the same brief. To reduce the risk of any mistakes the brief would set the standard for every element of the stamp including the typeface to be used for the value. The standard typeface used currently throughout the Machin series is the Jeffery Matthews drawn typeface. This error 5p Garamond typeface value made an appearance on the 5p Deep Ash Pink value of the Classic Album Covers pane of 7 January 2010, as well as the 54p Rust value from the same book, though it has since been corrected on all other printings. What in effect happened was that the digital artwork for this value was omitted from the material sent to Cartor for Booklet Panes DP411 and DP416 as well. Rather than ask Royal Mail for it, the printer tried to match the Jeffery Matthews typeface but made the wrong choice (The printer chose a Garamond one), although the letter "P" was correct. The error wasn't picked up at the proof stage and was spotted only after the finished product samples were delivered. A "suitable process" was put into place to avoid a repetition of this kind of mistake. Differences in typeface fonts are not new and can easily be seen on the early non-value indicator gold issues.

=== Mini sheet printings ===
High-quality Machins are found in the eight values of the 2000 Jeffery Matthews Colour Palette mini-sheet printed in photogravure by de la Rue, and the eleven stamps of the 2010 Festival of Stamps mini-sheet printed in lithography by Cartor. Both sheets exhibit high-quality printing and gave rise to all-new types and sub-types.

== Overseas ==
=== Crown dependencies ===
The first British stamps of the Machin series served as such in the Crown dependencies before their postal independence: Guernsey and Jersey until 1969 and the Isle of Man until 1973.

In Guernsey, the royal effigy on commemorative stamps was sometimes in the first years the Machin series effigy before the royal cypher was used (EIIR for Elizabeth 2 Regina).

=== Hong Kong ===
In the British colony of Hong Kong, the last definitive series featuring Queen Elizabeth II was an adapted version of the British Machin stamp, though the Machin effigy was tilted forward slightly. The effigy is placed to the right side of the illustration to make place for the place name in Chinese characters. The background is bicoloured. These were printed by both Enschedé, and Leigh-Mardon in lithography.

The first values were issued in June 1992. Many commemorative miniature sheets used the Hong Kong Machin stamp to mark philatelic events and the last moments of the British rule on the colony, and most but not all of them were in the $10.00 Hong Kong dollar denomination.

To prepare for the sovereignty of the People's Republic of China in July 1997, the Machin series was replaced in January 1997 by a new definitive series showing the urban panorama of Hong Kong.

=== Somaliland ===
In April 1996, the United Kingdom one penny Machin stamp was overprinted and used for a few days in Somaliland, a state that self-declared its independence from Somalia in 1991. Somaliland comprises the area formerly known as the British Somaliland Protectorate.

Due to an insufficient stock of paper, the British printer Harrison and Sons could not deliver in time a stamp issue ordered for Somaliland. Because of the lack of postage stamps there, it was decided to overprint "REPUBLIC / OF / SOMALILAND / 500 SHILLIN" on 4,300 Machin British one penny (1p) definitive stamps available at Harrison. The overprint was applied in Somaliland.

However, the stamps were quickly withdrawn and destroyed. There exist only about 30 or so genuinely postally used covers-and these were all posted by tourists who happened to be visiting Somaliland at the time.

=== Canada ===
Canada Post issued a domestic rate stamp on 7 February 2022 using the Machin design, to mark the Platinum Jubilee of Elizabeth II. The stamp is available in booklets of 10 self-adhesive stamps. This is the first time the Machin design has appeared on a Canadian stamp.

== References and sources ==
=== Sources of the articles ===
Books

- Muir, Douglas (2007). A Timeless Classic. The evolution of Machin's Icon. The British Postal Museum & Archive and Royal Mail. p. 236. ISBN 978-0-9553569-1-9. With the genesis of the Machin effigy, the author, curator of the BPMA, described the context of philatelic creation in Great Britain during the second half of the 1960s.
- Myall, Douglas (2007). 40 Years of Machins. A Timeline. British Philatelic Bulletin publication #13. London: Royal Mail. p. 20. OCLC 784947864. This book is a chronology of the main evolutions of the Machin series.

Articles

- West, Richard (June 2007). "Birth of an Icon". Stamp Magazine. 73 (6): 42–47. Article about the pre-decimal Machin stamps (1966–1971).
- West, Richard (June 2007). "Sold by the pound". Stamp Magazine. 73 (6): 50–54. Topical article centered on the £1 Machin stamps, throughout the series, with a chronology of the contracted printers.
- David Alderfer and Larry Rosenblum, "Colors of Machins were carefully considered", Linn's Stamp News, 8 July 1996.
- Larry Rosenblum, "Machins rainbow barely keeps up with needs", Linn's Stamp News, 12 August 1996.

=== Specialised bibliography ===
In English:

- Myall, Douglas. The Complete Deegam Machin Handbook. The third and last printed edition was published in July 2003 (2 volumes, 1272 pages), with regular supplements written. A CD-ROM version was edited in April 2005, and a CD-ROM-only fourth edition was published in May, 2010. See Presentation of the 3rd edition on the Great Britain Machins by The "Machin Nut" website, 25 July 2003; retrieved 18 June 2007.
- QE II Specialised Catalogue. Machin Collectors Club. Formerly Machin Specialised Catalogue, last updated in 2010 (2 volumes) with gummed stamps in the first volume, self-adhesives and booklets in the second one.
- The Stanley Gibbons Specialised Catalogues, comprising:
  - Vol. 3 Queen Elizabeth II Pre-Decimal Issues (12th Edition), published in February 2011
  - Vol. 4 Queen Elizabeth Decimal Definitive Issues Part 1 (10th Edition), published in April 2008
  - Vol. 4 Queen Elizabeth Decimal Definitive Issues Part 2 (10th Edition), published in April 2010

In French:

- Boulangier, François. Les Émissions de Grande-Bretagne au type Machin en valeurs décimales. Club philatélique franco-britannique. Fourth edition edited in June 2001.
