= James A. Mackay =

James A. Mackay

James Alexander Mackay (21 November 1936 – 12 August 2007) was a prolific Scottish writer and philatelist whose output of philatelic works was rivalled only by Fred Melville. He was described by John Holman, editor of the British Philatelic Bulletin, as a "philatelic writer without equal" but his reputation was damaged by a conviction for theft from the British Museum early in his career, which cost him his job there, and multiple accusations of plagiarism.

== Early life and family ==
James Mackay was born in Inverness on 21 November 1936. He was educated in Glasgow, where he also attended the university. Later in life Mackay was awarded a Doctor of Literature (D.Litt.) degree by Glasgow University.

He married Renate.

== Scottish posts ==
Interested in stamps and the postal system from an early age, he wrote two acclaimed histories of the Scottish posts; one limited to St. Kilda and, in 1978, his History of Scottish Postmarks, 1693–1978, the definitive work on the subject. He became a prolific philatelic author, especially on English, Irish and Scottish postmarks and also produced popular Postal History Annuals and island series books. He wrote some 200 books and at least 10,000 articles. Mackay's interest in the postal history of St Kilda had been formed during his time stationed there during his army service in the 1950s.

== Theft from the British Museum ==
In 1972 Mackay was dismissed from his job as an assistant keeper at the British Museum in London after he was convicted at the Old Bailey of stealing valuable proof stamps. He had pleaded guilty to five charges of stealing progressive proofs on loan from the Crown Agents from the Museum in 1965 and 1966 and was fined £1000. He had exchanged the proofs with dealer Clive Feigenbaum for Winston Churchill-themed stamps.

== Writing ==
He was the editor of The Burns Chronicle from 1976 to 1992, which under his stewardship reached a level of quality and diversity it has not achieved before or since. He then turned to biography, where he was less successful. Through the 1980s he worked on a biography of Robert Burns which was published in 1992 to favourable reviews and which won the Saltire Society Book of the Year Award. Subsequent biographies of Allan Pinkerton and William Wallace received more mixed reviews.

1996 saw the release of Michael Collins: A Life, a work about the life of the famed Irish revolutionary which received excellent reviews.

Mackay also wrote books under a number of different pseudonyms, including Ian Angus, William Finlay, Bruce Garden, Alex Matheson and Peter Whittington.

== Accusations of plagiarism ==
In 1998, he published a biography of Alexander Graham Bell. It was on the market briefly before Robert V. Bruce published a damning indictment, detailing sustained plagiarism of his own work, Alexander Graham Bell and the Conquest of Solitude. Far from being a little-known work, the latter had in fact been nominated for the Pulitzer Prize in 1973. The indictment, published in the American Historical Association's house journal, counted instances of plagiarism on 80 per cent of the pages published. Mackay paid his publishers to withdraw the book from circulation, and Bruce agreed not to sue.

Mackay then published a biography of John Paul Jones, the founder of the US Navy. While initially well received, and the subject of flattering reviews in the trade press, it was soon discovered that it was practically a copy of what those same reviews had marked as the last work on the man, that by Samuel Eliot Morison in 1942. That biography too had won the Pulitzer. Columbia University history professor David Armitage was quoted in the New York Times as saying that the book was "a spectacular and sustained act of plagiarism."

Despite these accusations, Mackay continued to be commissioned to write articles for the philatelic press, and it has been said that almost the entire text of some editions of Stamp & Coin Mart, a popular British magazine, were written by him.

== Death ==
Mackay died on 12 August 2007 at the age of 70 in Glasgow.

== Publications ==
=== Philatelic ===
- St Kilda; Its Posts and Communications, 1963, 73p.
- The Tapling Collection of Postage Stamps and Telegraph Stamps and Postal Stationery, British Museum, 53 pp, 1964
- The World of Stamps:thematic essays on recent new issues London: Johnson, 1964, 220p.
- Tristan Da Cunha: Its Postal History and Philately, 72 pp, Mackay & Crabb, 1965
- Commonwealth Stamp Design 1840-1965, British Museum, 32 pp, 1965
- Malta - The story of Malta and her stamps, Philatelic Publishers, 96 pp, 1966, ISBN 0-900864-10-9
- Great Britain: the story of Great Britain and her stamps London: Philatelic Publishers, 1967, 158p.
- Make Money with Stamps by Bruce Garden (pseudonym). London: Philatelic Publishers, 1967, 61p.
- Money in Stamps, Johnson Publications, 240 pp, 1967, ISBN 0-85307-000-8
- Learn about stamps by Bruce Garden (pseudonym). London: Philatelic Publishers, 1968, 61p.
- The Story of Éire and Her Stamps, Philatelic Publishers, 1968
- Cover Collecting - A Collecta Guide to First Day & Other Covers, Philatelic Publishers, 1968
- East Africa: The Story of East Africa and Its Stamps, Philatelic Publishers, 192 pp, 1970, ISBN 0-900864-01-X
- New Encyclopedia of Stamps, IPC Magazines, 1970
- Airmails, 1870-1970, Batsford, 216 pp, 1971, ISBN 0-7134-0380-2
- The World of Classic Stamps; 1840-1870, New York: Putnam, 1972.
- The Dictionary of Stamps in Colour, Michael Joseph, 296 pp, 1973, ISBN 0-7181-1124-9
- Stamps, posts, and postmarks, by Ian Angus (pseudonym). London: Ward Lock, 1973. ISBN 0-7063-1810-2, 128p.
- An Illustrated History of Stamp Design by William Finlay (pseudonym), Peter Lowe, 187 pp, 1974, ISBN 0-85654-609-7
- Encyclopedia of World Stamps, 1945-1975, Lionel Leventhal Ltd, 160 pp, 1976, ISBN 0-07-044595-8
- Scottish Postmarks 1693-1987, J.A. Mackay: self-published, 68 pp, 1978
- The Circular Name Stamps of Scotland, J.A. Mackay: self-published, 1978
- The Skeleton Postmarks of Scotland, J.A. Mackay: self-published, 1978
- The Floating Post Offices of the Clyde, J.A. Mackay: self-published, 1979, 40p.
- English and Welsh Postmarks Since 1840, J.A. Mackay: self-published, 1980, 254pp.
- Stamp Collecting, Park Lane Press, 80pp, 1980
- British Post Office Numbers 1924-1969, J.A. Mackay: self-published, 50 pp, 1981
- Telegraphic Codes of the British Isles, 1879-1924, J.A. Mackay: self-published, 90 pp, 1981
- The Parcel Post of the British Isles, J.A. Mackay: self-published, 232 pp, 1982
- Registered Mail of the British Isles, J.A. Mackay: self-published, 395 pp, 1982
- Irish Postmarks Since 1840, J.A. Mackay: self-published, 222 pp, 1982
- The Guinness Book of Stamps: Facts and Feats, Enfield: Guinness Publishing, 225 pp, 1982, ISBN 0-85112-241-8; 2nd Edition, Guinness Publishing Ltd, 225 pp, 1989, ISBN 0-85112-351-1
- Official Mail of the British Isles, J.A. Mackay: self-published, 349 pp, 1983
- Scottish Twin-Arc Postmarks with Stampers Numbers 1894-1963, J.A. Mackay: self-published, 1983, 53p.
- The Postal History of Glasgow, J.A. Mackay: self-published, 1984
- Surcharged Mail of the British Isles, J.A. Mackay: self-published, 1984, 138 pp
- British Stamps, Longman, 247 pp, 1985, ISBN 0-582-40620-X
- Dátstampái Rubair na bhFo-Oificí an Phoist in Éirinn, J.A. Mackay: self-published, 1985 ISBN 0906440351, 96p.
- Sub Office Rubber Datestamps of Ireland, J.A. Mackay: self-published, 1985 ISBN 0-906440-36-X, 68p.
- Sub Office Rubber Datestamps of Scotland, J.A. Mackay: self-published, 1985 ISBN 0-906440-34-3, 63p.
- Postal History of Dumfries, 1986, self-published, 120 pp, ISBN 0-906440-38-6
- Sub Office Rubber Datestamps of England and Wales, J.A. Mackay: self-published, 1986, ISBN 0-906440-39-4
- English Provincial Krags (Machine Cancellations), 1987
- Irish Slogan Postmarks 1918-1986, J.A. Mackay: self-published, 1987 ISBN 0-906440-42-4, 69p.
- Postmarks of England and Wales, J.A. Mackay: self-published, 352 pp, 1988, ISBN 0-906440-46-7
- Under the Gum – Background to British Stamps 1840–1940, Limassol: James Bendon, 1997, ISBN 9963-579-76-0, 536p.
- Philatelic Terms Illustrated, Stanley Gibbons Limited, 4th edition, 2003, 173 pp, ISBN 0-85259-557-3
- The World Encyclopedia of Stamps and Stamp Collecting, 2005, Lorenz Books, 256 pp, ISBN 0-7548-1530-7
- 1800 Stamps of the World: A Stunning Visual Directory of Rare and Familiar Issues, Organized Country by Country with over 1800 Images of Collectables from up to 200 Countries, Southwater, 160 pp, 2007, ISBN 1-84476-346-3
- Postal History Annual 1979 J.A. Mackay: self-published 1979
- Postal History Annual 1980 J.A. Mackay: self-published 1980
- Postal History Annual 1981 J.A. Mackay: self-published 1981
- Postal History Annual 1982 J.A. Mackay: self-published 1982
- Postal History Annual 1983 J.A. Mackay: self-published 1983
- Postal History Annual 1984 J.A. Mackay: self-published 1984
- Postal History Annual 1985 J.A. Mackay: self-published 1985
- Postal History Annual 1986 J.A. Mackay: self-published 1986

=== Scottish Islands Postal History Series ===
- No. 1: Harris & St Kilda J.A. Mackay: self-published 80 pgs
- No. 2: The Uists & Barra J.A. Mackay: self-published 57 pgs
- No. 3: Lewis J.A. Mackay: self-published 62 pgs
- No. 4: Skye and the Small Isles J.A. Mackay: self-published 70 pgs
- No. 5: Arran & Cumbrae J.A. Mackay: self-published 39 pgs
- No. 6: Bute J.A. Mackay: self-published 38 pgs
- No. 7: Orkney & Stroma J.A. Mackay: self-published 64 pgs
- No. 8: Shetland J.A. Mackay: self-published 70 pgs
- No. 9: Mull, Iona, Coll & Tiree J.A. Mackay: self-published 37 pgs
- No. 10: Islay, Jura and the other Argyll Isles J.A. Mackay: self-published 39 pgs
- No. 11: Scottish Islands Supplement & Catalogue J.A. Mackay: self-published 64 pgs
- No. 12: Isle of Wight J.A. Mackay: self-published 112 pgs

=== Biographies ===
- Vagabond of Verse: Robert Service - a Biography, Trafalgar Square, ISBN 1-85158-704-7, 1996
- Allan Pinkerton: The First Private Eye, John Wiley & Sons, Somerset, NJ, ISBN 0471194158, 1997
- Michael Collins: A Life, Trafalgar Square, ISBN 1851588574, 1997
- Alexander Graham Bell: A Life, John Wiley & Sons, Somerset, NJ, ISBN 0-471-24045-1, 1998
- William Wallace: Brave Heart, Mainstream, ISBN 1-85158-823-X, 1995
- The Man Who Invented Himself: a Life of Sir Thomas Lipton, Mainstream Publishing, Edinburgh ISBN 978-1-85158-831-2, 1998
- Little Boss, A life of Andrew Carnegie: Mainstream Publishing Edinburgh ISBN 978-1-85158-832-9 1997

=== Robert Burns ===
- The Complete Letters of Robert Burns, 1987, Alloway Publishing, 862 pp, ISBN 0-907526-32-2
- The Complete Works of Robert Burns, 1988, Hyperion Books, 704 pp, ISBN 0-907526-23-3
- Burns A-Z: the Complete Word Finder, 1990, (self published), 774 pp, ISBN 0-906440-51-3, ISBN 0-906440-50-5
- Burns: A Biography of Robert Burns, 1992, Mainstream Publishing, 672 pp, ISBN 1-85158-462-5
- Robert Burns, the Complete Poetical Works, 1993, Alloway Publishing Ltd, 640 pp, ISBN 0-907526-62-4
- Burns, A Biography, 2004, Alloway Publishing Ltd, 749 pp, ISBN 0-907526-86-1

=== Other subjects ===
- Antiques of the future; a guide for collectors and investors, 1970, Universe Books, 208 pp, ISBN 0-87663-117-0
- Glass Paperweights, Littlehampton Book Services Ltd, 1973, 136 pp, ISBN 0-7063-1102-7
- The Animaliers: A Collector's Guide to the Animal Sculptors of the 19th & 20th Centuries, Dutton, 1973, 160 pp, ISBN 0-525-05498-7
- Dictionary of Western Sculptors in Bronze, 1973, Antique Collector's Club, 1977, 414 pp, ISBN 0-902028-55-3
- Coins: Facts and Feats, 1993, Spink & Son Ltd, 276 pp, ISBN 1-85264-069-3
- Clans and Tartans of Scotland, 2000, ISBN 0-517-16240-7
- Glasgow's Other River : Exploring the Kelvin, 2000, Fort Publishing Ltd, 240 pp, published under pseudonym Alex Matheson, ISBN 0-9536576-2-0
- Soldiering on St Kilda, 2002, Token Publishing Ltd, 180 pp, ISBN 1-870192-48-6
- The St Kilda Steamers, 2006, The History Press Ltd, 192 pp, ISBN 0-7524-3878-6

== References and sources ==
Notes

Sources

- John Holman, Obituary: James Alexander Mackay: Philatelic writer without equal, Gibbons Stamp Monthly, October 2007, p. 16.
