= Douglas Myall =

British philatelist and civil servant (1922–2019)

Douglas Myall (17 December 1922 – 30 January 2019) was a British civil servant and philatelist. He is known for his exhaustive study of the Machin stamps, the British definitive series in use since 1967. His catalogue, The Complete Deegam Machin Handbook, is one of the main reference books about this series.

== Life ==
Myall was born in Essex on 17 December 1922. A civil servant, he finished his career at the trademark registry of the Patent Office. He became interested in stamps while working at the office of the Inspector of Foreign Dividends, where he kept stamps from the incoming mail.

In the 1950s and 1960s, he collected the Wilding stamps, the first definitives of Queen Elizabeth II's reign. At the same time, he was working at the Inland Revenue and studied security printing that had been helping him in his philatelic activities. His first articles had been published in philatelic press.

From their commencement, in 1967, Myall collected Machins and was a founding member of two specialised clubs; the Great Britain Decimal Stamp Book Study Circle (GB DSB SC) and the British Decimal Stamps Study Circle (BDSSC), being the founding president of the BDSSC, a position he held for 18 years. The two study circles merged to form the Modern British Philatelic Circle (MBPC) in 2006. He wrote articles for both these circles' and the Great Britain Philatelic Society's journals, Royal Mail's British Philatelic Bulletin and Stamp Collecting magazine. In his obituary in Stamp Magazine, Myall was said to be "the world's leading expert on Machin definitives".

Myall was not content with the way BDSSC and the Stanley Gibbons catalogue were handling the potential criteria to study Machin stamps. He therefore decided to write his own catalogue, with an aspiration to be as exhaustive and precise as possible. The Complete Deegam Machin Handbook (Note: Deegam is derived from his complete initials : Douglas George Albert Myall.) was first published in 1993. This was followed by a second and a third edition, the latter being published in July 2003. A CD-ROM version of the third edition was introduced in 2005, and a fourth edition available on CD-ROM only was published in April 2010. It was regularly updated by the Deegam Reports sent by e-mail to book owners and printed for their members by some philatelic associations.

Aside from the Machins, Douglas Myall collected British perfins on covers and practised macro photography of insects.

Myall's wife, Kathleen, died in 2014. They had two daughters, Delia and Fiona. Douglas Myall died on 30 January 2019.

Pursuant to arrangements made by Myall before his death, two experienced philatelists, Hanns Fasching and Gerry Fisk, are continuing work on The Complete Deegam Machin Handbook. The fifth edition of the Handbook was released in November 2020. The Deegam Reports continue to provide periodic updates.

== Works ==
- The Complete Deegam Machin Handbook (first published 1993, most recent edition 2010 on CD-ROM only, with regular updates being published)
- (2007) 40 Years of Machins. A Timeline, publication #13 of the British Philatelic Bulletin, Royal Mail, OCLC 784947864. This is a 20-page chronology of the Machin series.

== Honours ==
- Fellow of the Royal Philatelic Society London from 2011.
- Award and medals for the Deegam catalogue at philatelic exhibitions:
  - National Postal Museum medal for research, 1997.
  - Gold medal at ChicagoPex, 1997.
  - Silver Gilt medal at Stampex, 1997.
  - Vermeil at Palmerston Exhibition, New Zealand, 1997.
  - Gold medal at Korpex, South Korea, 2000.
