= Castle series stamps =

Two definitive stamp series issued in the UK

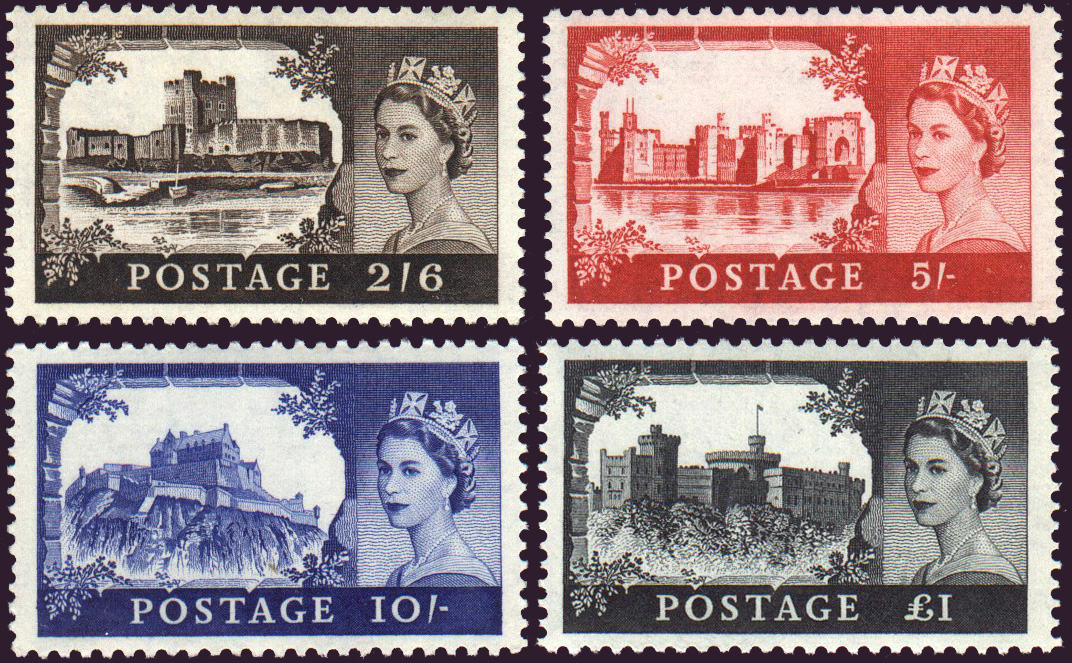
First Castle series stamps in 2/6, 5/-, 10/- and £1 denominations issued in 1955

The Castle series or Castle High Value series are two definitive stamp series issued in the United Kingdom during Queen Elizabeth II's reign. The common aspects of the two series are the four chosen castles, one for each country of the United Kingdom.

The first series, designed by Lynton Lamb was issued in September 1955. The second, created from pictures taken by Prince Andrew, Duke of York, the Queen's second son, was issued in October 1988.

The stamps bore the highest denominations completing the Wilding and Machin definitive series. Each Castle series was replaced by Machin stamps, respectively in 1969 and 1999.

== The 1955 series ==
=== Genesis ===
The 1955 Castle series replaced another four stamp series of high value issued in 1951. They featured the profile of King George VI and were illustrated by two pictures (HMS Victory, Lord Nelson's ship, on the 2 shillings and 6 pence, and the white cliffs of Dover on the 5 shillings) and two symbols (Saint George and the Dragon on the 10 shillings and the Royal Coat of arms on the one pound sterling stamp). The King's death, on 6 February 1952, provoked the preparation for a new series with Elizabeth II's effigy.

Because comments in the philatelic press were negative about the two pictorial stamps, the Postal Services Department proposed to replace the pictures with two new allegorical images. But its director decided the artists invited by the Council of Industrial Design must be free in the proposal they had to submit at the beginning of 1953.

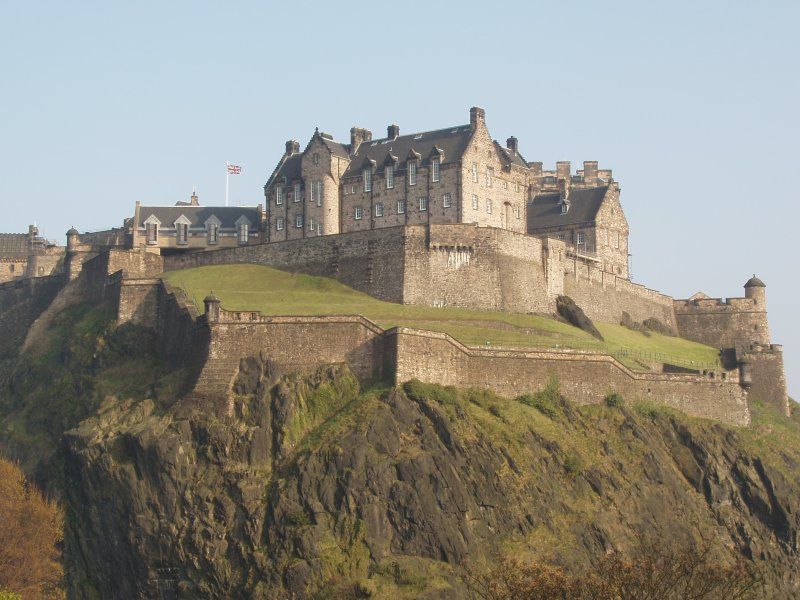
Photograph of Edinburgh Castle from similar viewpoint as the stamps

In June 1953, the allegorical designs didn't please Postmaster General Herbrand Sackville and the Council of Industrial Design. Inspired by Mary Ashead's projects using non allegorical images, including castles, they let some artists and printers Waterlow and Sons create propositions with views of British monuments, known to the public and linked to Royal Family history. The initial list was: the Tower of London on the 2s 6d green, Caernarfon Castle on the 5s red, Edinburgh Castle on the 10s blue and Windsor Castle on the £1 brown.

When consulted, the Home Secretary, David Maxwell Fyfe, advised adding a castle from Northern Ireland: the Tower of London was replaced by Carrickfergus Castle, located on the north side of Belfast Lough. The proposed green colour for the 2s 6d stamp was changed to brown: the goal was to avoid evocations of Irish nationalist sentiment. The pound sterling stamp became black. The remaining artists prepared their projects during the summer of 1953. They created drawings of the castles helped by postmen's and public servants' pictures, and projects for the frame.

At the same time, H.J. Bard, an engraver at Waterlow and Sons, prepared the royal effigy reproducing Dorothy Wilding's photographic portrait already used on the definitive series.

In January 1954, Lynton Lamb's scenery, known as "broken grotto", was chosen: the castle is in the reader's sight through a hole in an old stone wall, next to which is standing the Queen's portrait. Under the guidance and requirements of officials, Lamb continued his work on the drawings of the castles during 1954, visiting in person Edinburgh and Windsor.

On 25 October 1954, Postmaster General Sackville thought the design was ready and brought it to the Council of Industrial Design in November. There, he defended the passage from two to one colour. Queen Elizabeth II approved the designs in March 1955. At Waterlow's, Ward under Lamb's attention made the master die for the printing in intaglio. The issue was finally accepted by the Queen on 29 June 1955.

=== British career ===
The issue of the four stamps took place in two stages: 2 shillings 6 pence brown "Carrickfergus Castle" and 5s red "Caernarfon Castle" were issued on 1 September 1955, and the sale began on 23 September for the other two: 10 shillings blue "Edinburgh Castle" and 1 pound black "Windsor Castle".

From 1955 to 1957, the stamps were printed by Waterlow and Sons on watermarked paper: the St. Edward's Crown with the Royal Cypher ("E 2 R"). In 1958, with the same watermark, then a crowned watermark in 1959, the printing was given to De La Rue. The contract passed in 1967 to Bradbury Wilkinson who did not use watermarked paper anymore.

In the United Kingdom, the four stamps were withdrawn on 15 May 1970, one year after the issue of Machin high value stamps printed in high format in intaglio by Bradbury Wilkinson. The three lesser value of the Castle series were invalidated on 1 March 1972.

=== Overseas use ===
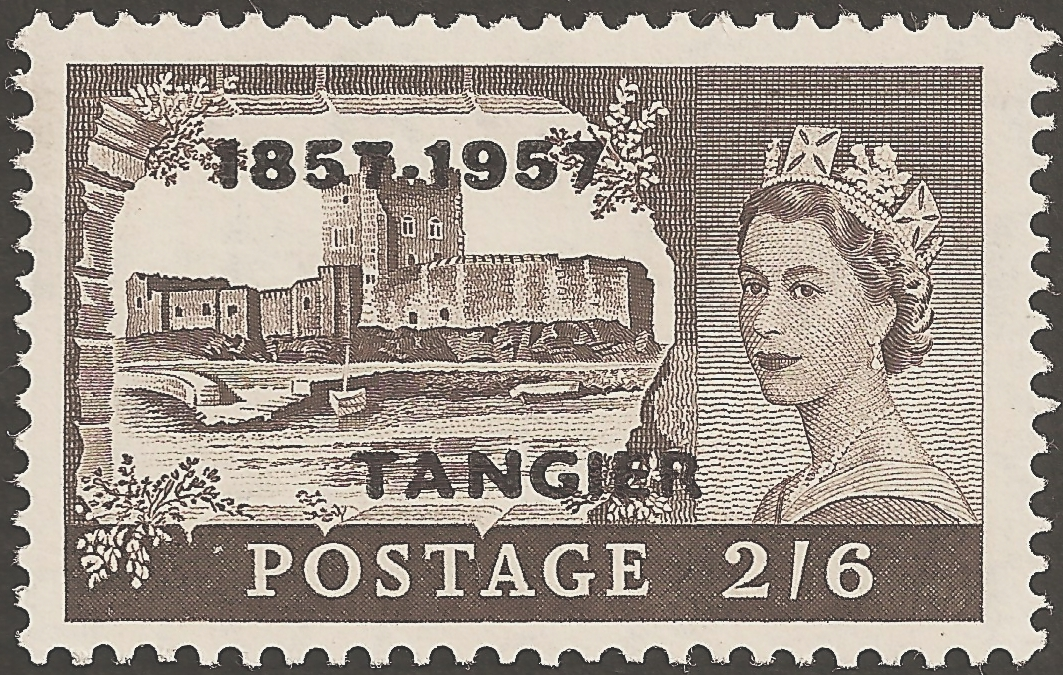
2/6 brown overprinted for the centenary of the Tangier postal agency, in Morocco.

The 2 shilling and 6 pence, 5 shilling and 10 shilling stamps were issued with overprints in British postal agencies overseas. Only Waterlow and Sons and De La Rue printed stamps were so issued. The overprint indicated the territory of use.

Around the Persian Gulf, stamps needed a new denomination in Indian rupees, later in Gulf rupees, being overprinted to be used in Bahrain, Kuwait, Qatar and the Trucial States.

In Tangier, Morocco, the three Castle stamps were available at the British post office in 1955. When the office had to be closed in 1957, its centenary was celebrated with a second overprint ("1857 - 1957") on all Wilding and Castle stamps. Some Castle stamps are known without the hyphen or with one printed thanks to a third overprint.

=== Commemoratives ===
On 22 March 2005, Royal Mail issued a minisheet for the 50th anniversary of the Castle series. Denominations were changed to 50 pence for a brown "Carrickfergus Castle" and a dark brown "Windsor Castle", and one pound for a red "Caernarfon Castle" and a blue "Edinburgh Castle". The Dutch printer Enschedé succeeded in using the original dies to create the new printing material, but for the Windsor Castle stamp digitalization of a 1955 stamp was necessary.

== The 1988 series ==
=== Description ===
On 18 October 1988, the four large-format high value Machin stamps, printed in photogravure and issued since February 1977, were replaced by a new Castle series. The four new stamps were printed in intaglio, and their illustrations were based on photographs taken by Prince Andrew. The profile of Queen Elizabeth II appeared on one of the upper corners, and was based on Arnold Machin's sculpture that appears on the Machin series. The same castles were used as for the 1955 series: Carrickfergus on a £1 green stamp, Caernarfon on the £1.50 brown, Edinburgh on the £2 blue and Windsor on the £5 brown. The broken grotto design was replaced by a white background, and was considered austere compared to the romantic approach of Lyndon Lamb.

=== Career ===
In 1992, the series was reissued with two changed elements, in order to fight counterfeiting. An elliptical perforation was added to the sides, and Optically Variable Ink (OVI), which appears green or gold depending on how it is viewed, was used to print the Queen's profile. The latter was no longer the Machin head with crown, but the monocolour profile created by Machin for commemorative stamps.

In 1995, the £1 Carrickfergus Castle stamp was reissued with a new denomination of three pounds, because inflation no longer justified the use of an expensive printing method like intaglio for the one pound value. A £1 Machin definitive stamp was created the same year, printed in a blue-violet metallic ink. On 9 March 1999, the second Castle series was replaced by four Machin stamps printed in intaglio from a gravure by Czesław Słania.

== References and sources ==
Notes

Sources

- The First Elizabeth II Castle High Value Definitives, publication #11 of the British Philatelic Bulletin, published by Royal Mail, 2005, 20 pages.
- Yvert et Tellier (1998). Third tome of its stamp catalogue : Timbres de l'Europe de l'Ouest, first part, pages 774 (1955 and 1958 issues), 809 (1988), 816-817 (1992) et 822 (1995).
