= Crown agency =

State-controlled enterprises in some states of the British Commonwealth

A crown agency was an administrative body of the British Empire, distinct from the Civil Service Commission of Great Britain or the government administration of the national entity in which it operated. These enterprises were overseen from 1833 to 1974 by the Office of the Crown Agents in London, thereafter named the Crown Agents for Oversea Governments and Administration. Crown Agents for Oversea Governments and Administrations Ltd became a private limited company providing development services in 1996.

Today the term is also used to refer to state-controlled companies in some states of the British Commonwealth.

== Office of the Crown Agencies ==
=== Operation ===
Crown agencies nominally reported directly to (and were wholly owned by) the Crown, but in practice, reported to the Crown Agency Office in London, thus independent of the Colonial Office. This office became, in the late 19th century, the sole official British commercial and financial agent of all British protectorates and Crown colonies. The Colonial Office enforced a policy of sole usage of crown agencies for all purchases of goods for government use, creating a virtual monopoly over government retail supply within the colonies of the British Empire. The crown agencies also became financial institutions, supplying capital, routes for investment, and pensions to all public works and government in British dependent colonies (excluding such Dominions as Canada or Australia). Crown Agencies were the bodies responsible for all large projects such as railway or harbour construction throughout British Africa, India, and the West Indies.

=== History ===
Crown agencies trace their founding to the time of the British Empire and in 1833 the British government, hived off from the Colonial Office as a financing, stores, transport, and development (to use a modern term) office. Historians have argued that crown agencies, whose organisations operated across the British Empire in the late 19th and early 20th centuries, were the de facto administrators of British colonies. Crown agencies welded governmental powers through the maze of British, territories, protectorates, dependencies, mandates, and Crown colonies which de jure made up the British Empire of the late 19th century. From 1833 to 1880, they also operated in areas with Dominion status. After this, their mandate was reduced to "dependent" colonies (most of British Africa, India, and the West Indies), but they were given near monopoly rights over finance and supply of non-local manufactures for any public or government use.

With the dissolution of the British Empire, many of these agencies reverted to control by their respective governments, became parts of the British government, or became non-governmental organisations. The central Crown Agency Office became involved in the secondary banking sector, but the secondary banking crisis of 1973–1975 drove the office into a debt of over £2 million and the office filed for bankruptcy in 1974. The British government at the time found the office useful for overseas development and, argues one writer, enabled aid to be channelled to British goods, while providing cover for unsavoury expenditures such as arms sales. This last function was carried out by what was originally a wholly owned subsidiary of the Crown Agency Office, Millbank Technical Services (1967–79, when it was transferred to the Ministry of Defence and renamed), which has since been accused of Neocolonial involvement in former British colonies and covert arms sales. The British government incorporated the Crown Agency Office as a government-mandated corporation tied to the Minister of Overseas Development, called the Crown Agents for Overseas Governments and Administration. In 1997, the Crown Agency Office was privatised. As a private limited company, the CAOGA has a number of contracts to provide governmental or para-governmental services throughout the world, such as providing the customs services of the Government of Angola

== Contemporary usage ==
The legal category of crown agencies still exists in some nations of the former British Empire. In most places, these have been replaced by government agencies, state-controlled companies, and (in parts of the Commonwealth) Crown Corporations. Canada and New Zealand maintain the category of government managed or government owned entities called Crown Agencies that report to the sovereign governments in the countries where they operate.

=== Canada ===
In Canada, the term "crown agency" may refer to any government agency, created by statute, which does not report to a government ministry. CN Rail and the Ontario Heritage Foundation are examples under Canadian law of crown agencies.

=== New Zealand ===
The term is also used under New Zealand law to designate state owned enterprises which do not report directly to a single Ministry.

=== Crown bodies ===
In the United Kingdom, the term is sometimes used to refer to Crown bodies: public bodies which have Crown status, meaning that material which they produce is subject to Crown copyright protection.

== See also ==
- Crown Agents Philatelic and Security Printing Archive
- Crown corporations
- Crown corporations of Canada
