= Graphite lined stamp =

Postage stamp with electro-conductive graphite lines

A graphite lined stamp is a postage stamp on which vertical lines of electro-conductive graphite are printed on the reverse. Graphite lined stamps were used in the United Kingdom from 1957 to 1960 as an experiment in the automation of mail sorting.

== Usage and appearance ==
In the United Kingdom, graphite lines were used exclusively on five stamps of the Wilding series from December 1957. They appear as one or two black lines printed vertically under the gum. The two lined stamps were to identify fully paid mail, which eventually became first class mail, while stamps with only one line paid the printed matter rate, or second class mail as it eventually became. On the two lined stamps, the bands are usually found widely spaced so that one appears at either side of the stamp, but they may also be found close together due to printing errors on the one and a half pence stamp. Several other errors of misplaced graphite lines are also known and not all are included in the Stanley Gibbons catalogue.

The use of graphite lines was developed by British Post Office scientists in conjunction with the stamp printers Harrison & Sons of High Wycombe and the stamps were first used in an experimental machine at Southampton. The machine used scanners to detect the graphite lines and to face the letters so that the stamp was always in the top right corner. The machine could also sort the letters according to the number of graphite lines on the stamps so that fully paid and printed matter stamps were separated. The machine then cancelled the letters. This was the first time that this had been done automatically.

From November 1959, graphite lined stamps were issued with phosphor bands printed on the front of the stamp. Ultimately, graphite band marking was superseded by the use of phosphor band marking which was a more effective form of mail sorting and only phosphor bands remained on Wilding stamps after 22 June 1960.

== Graphite ==
The term graphite refers to the substance Naphthadag or Deflocculated Acheson's Graphite, which was graphite in a solution of naphtha. This graphite substance went under the brand name dag, which was a registered trademark of Acheson Colloids Ltd. The substance is still a product of the firm today.

== Forgeries ==
Graphite lined stamps have become very collectable and often command high prices. This has attracted forgers, however, most forgeries are easily identified by comparison with a genuine stamp. Crucially, on the genuine stamps the lines appear underneath the gum.
