= Crown Agents Collection =

The Crown Agents Collection is a collection of unused British Commonwealth philatelic material produced by the Crown Agents since 1922. The collection forms part of the British Library Philatelic Collections. Material given by the Crown Agents from 1900 to 1922 is included in the Supplementary Collection.

== See also ==
- Crown Agents Philatelic and Security Printing Archive
