= Philatelic Traders' Society =

Trade association for stamp dealers and traders

The PTS logo

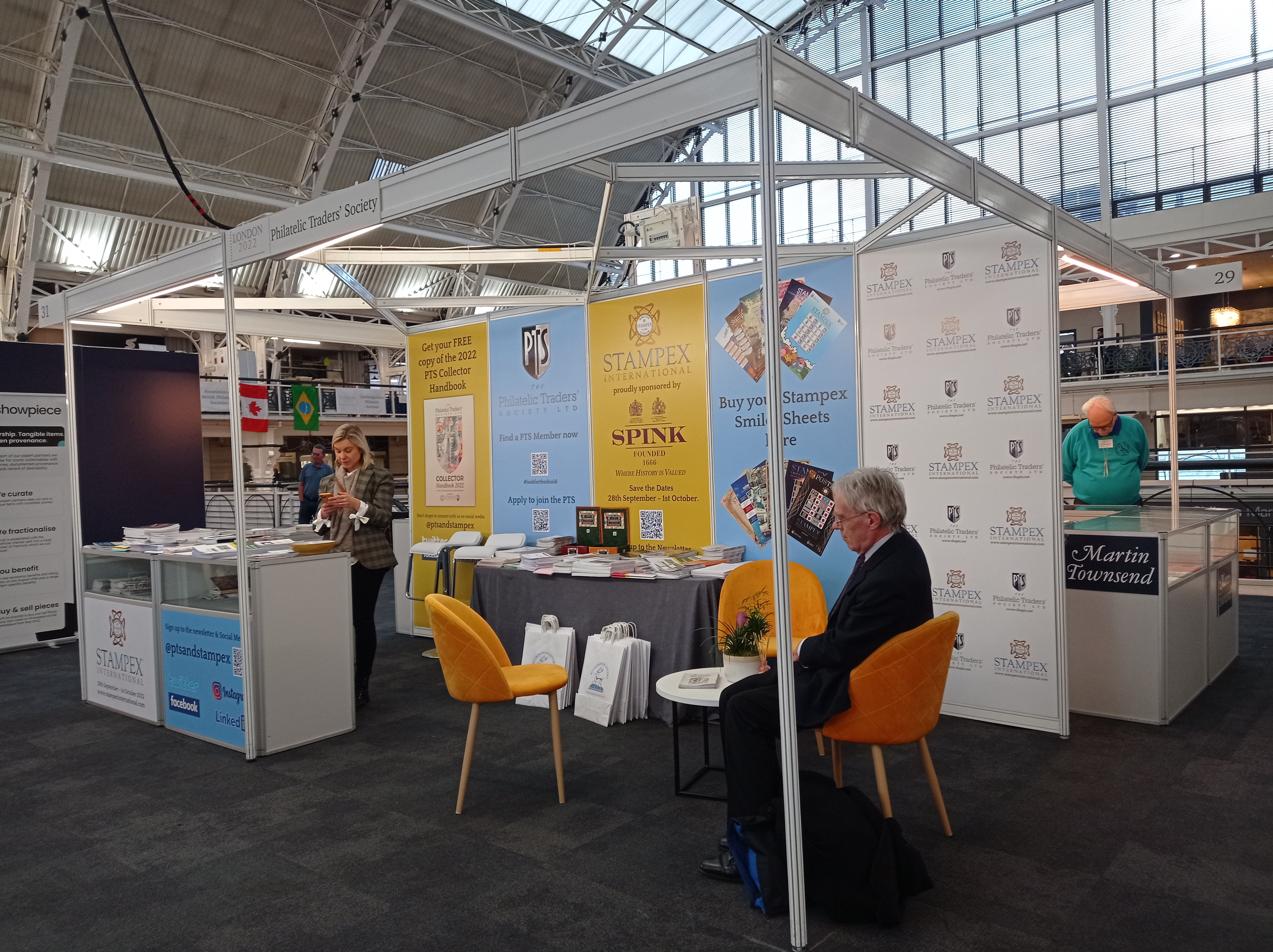
The PTS at the London 2022 International Stamp Exhibition

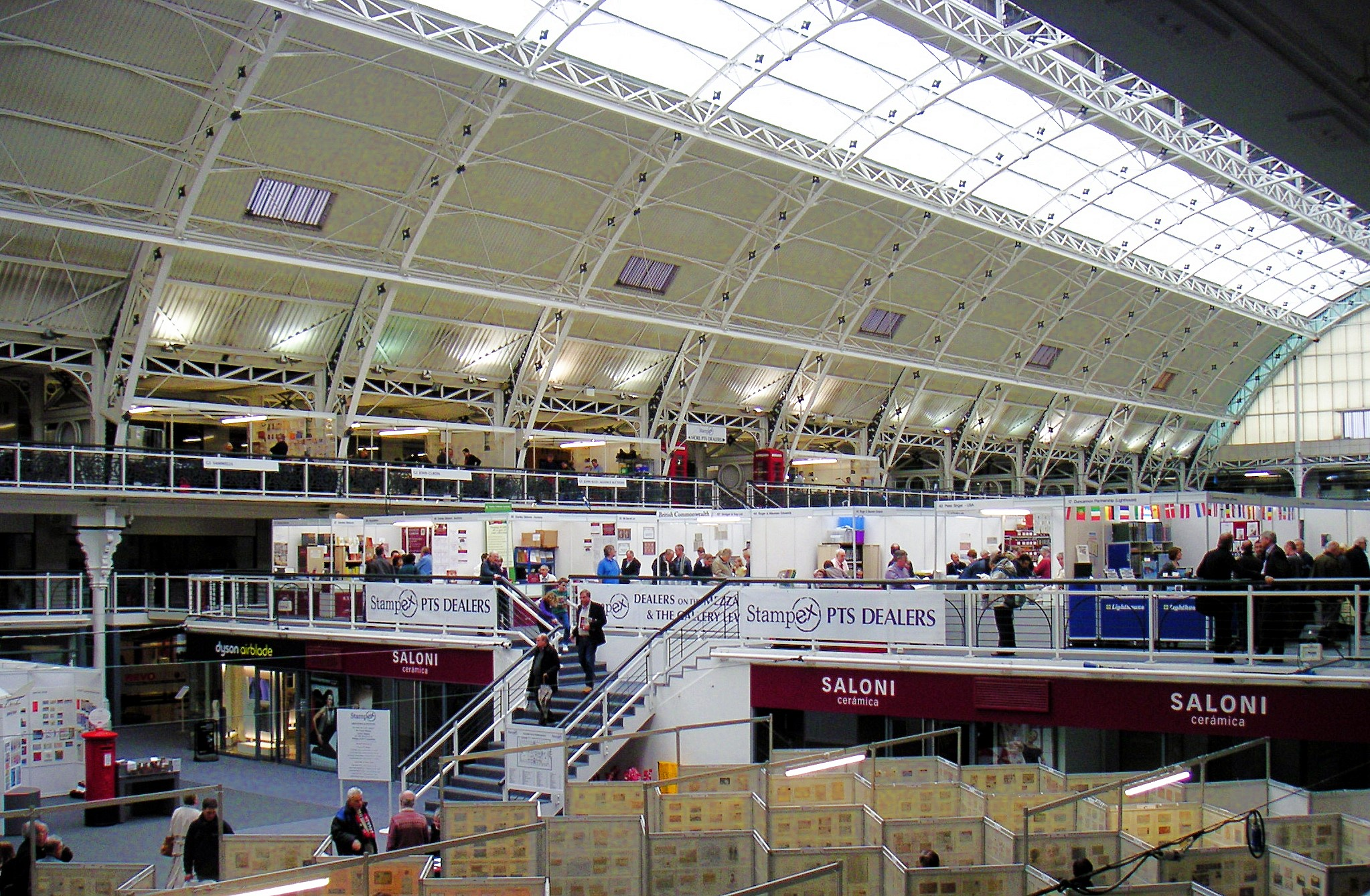
The Stampex show run by the PTS

The Philatelic Traders' Society Ltd. (PTS) is a trade association for stamp dealers and philatelic traders which was established in Britain in 1928 and continues to this day.

== Activities ==
The Society acts as a trade association on behalf of philatelic dealers, providing a Code of Conduct, an Arbitration Scheme, a trade directory, a special insurance scheme and similar services.

The Society has stated that it represents members who trade in philatelic material and who provide professional expertise only and that investment advice and encouraging philatelic investment is outside the scope of the Society.

Through its company PTS Stamp and Coin Exhibitions Ltd it organises the long-running British stamp exhibition Stampex International.

The majority of the Society's members are based in the United Kingdom but there are also a number of international philatelic dealers in the membership.

== History ==
The society was formed in 1928 and was incorporated as The Philatelic Traders' Society Limited on 14 September 1946. The company is registered at Companies House in Cardiff as company number 419382.

The first Chairman was Albert H. Harris and the first Secretary was Vera Trinder. The current Chair is Simon Carson (2021-) and the current Managing Director is Suzanne Rae.

== People ==
The current, active PTS Council is available on the society website.

Names of the current PTS Directors can be found at Companies House.

== See also ==
- American Stamp Dealers Association
