= Stampex =

- Status: Active
- Genre: Conventions
- Frequency: Annually
- Venue: Business Design Centre
- Locations: Islington, London
- Country: United Kingdom
- Years active: 1956
- Sponsor: Philatelic Traders Society
- Website: www.stampexinternational.com

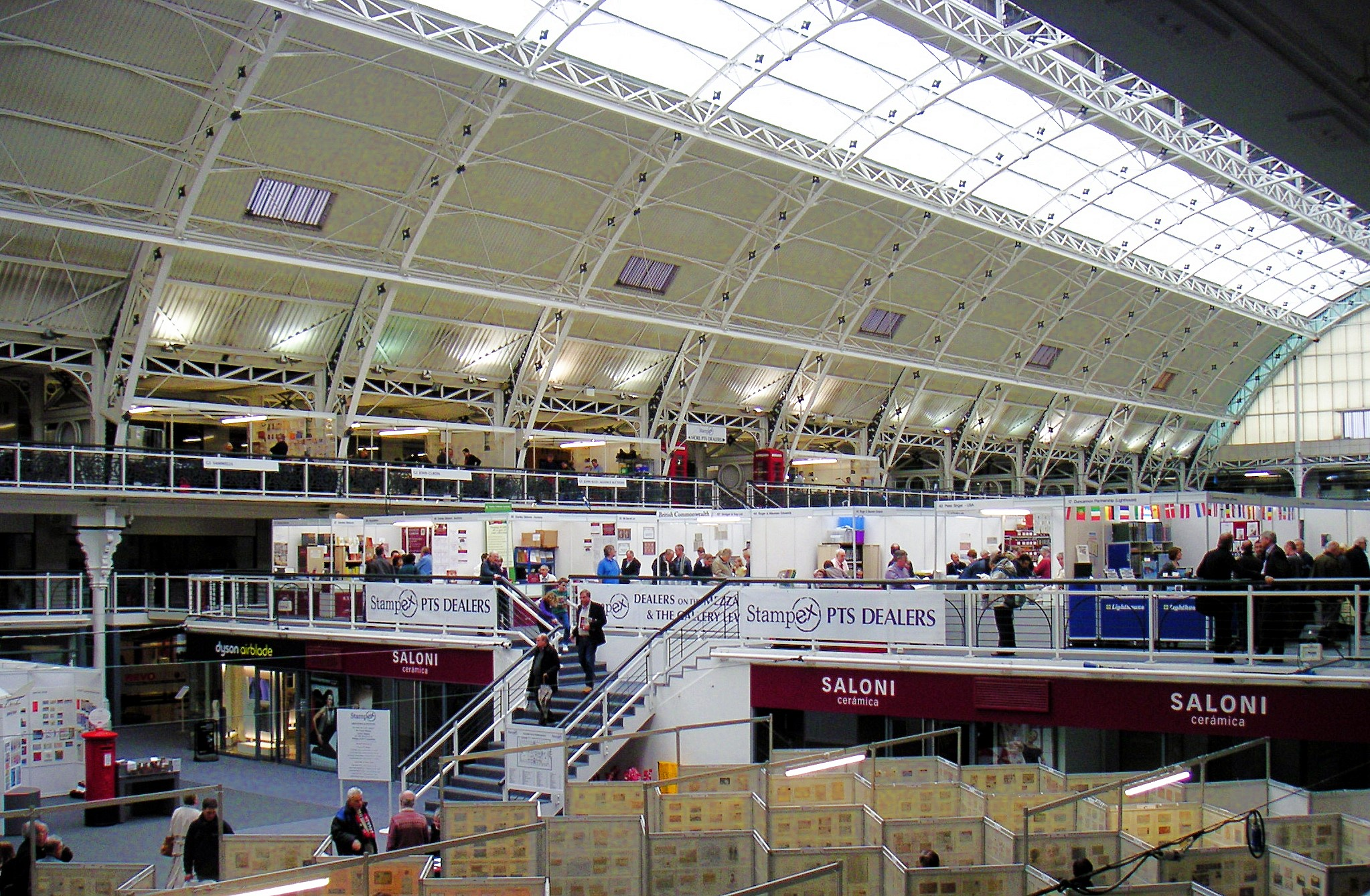
View from the east end of the hall, Spring Stampex 2011.

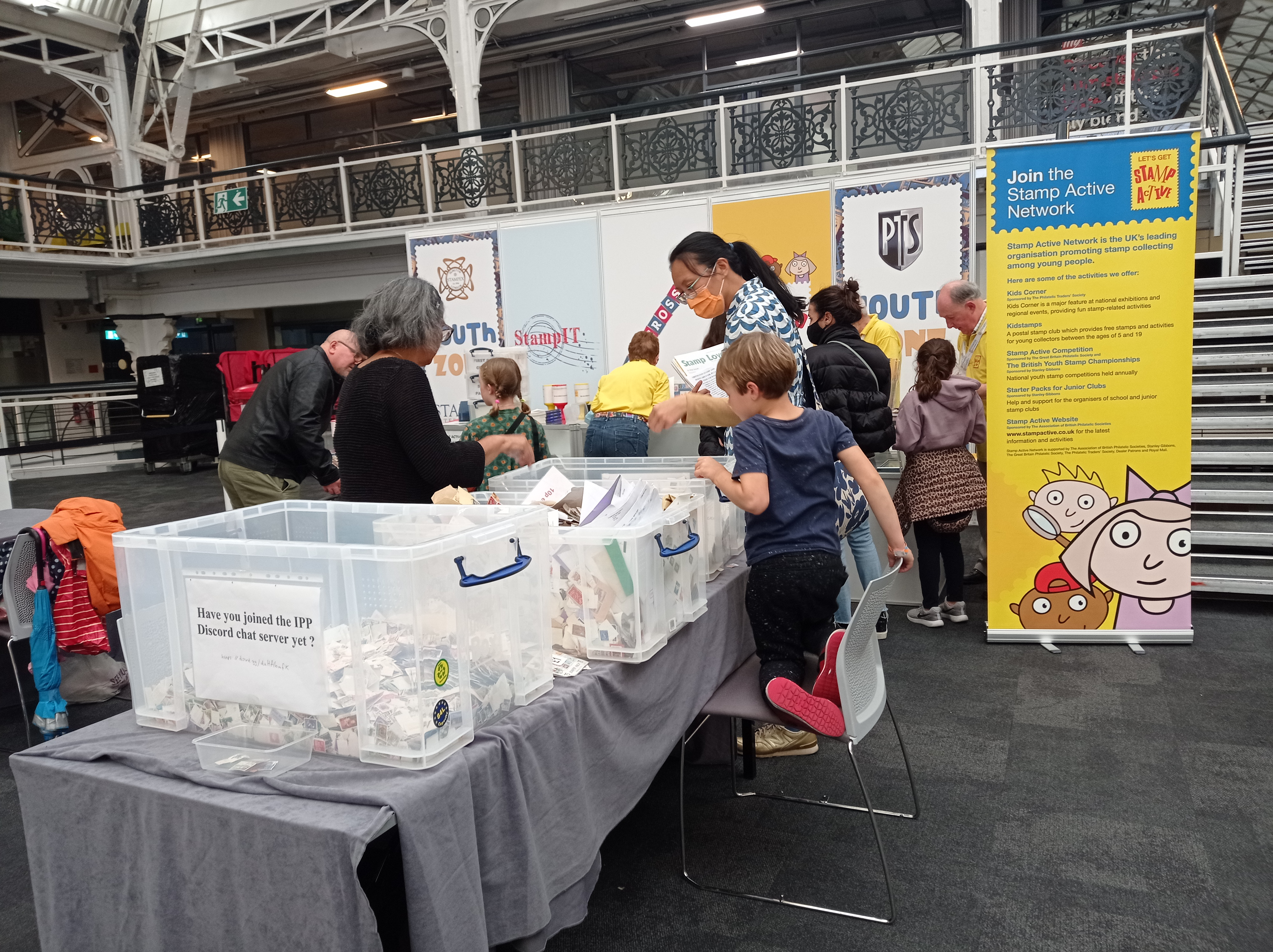
The Stamp Active stand, Autumn Stampex 2021

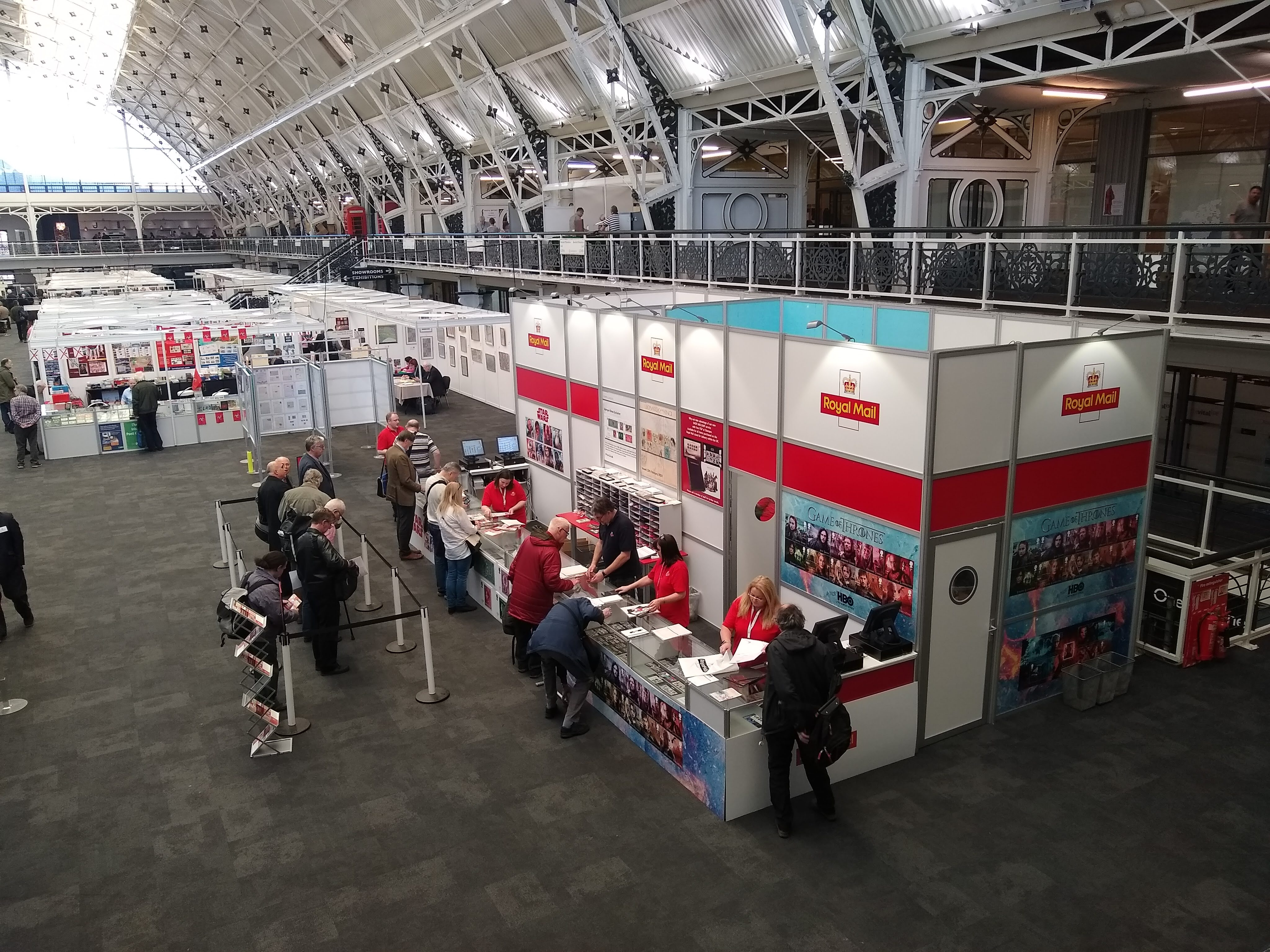
The Royal Mail stand at Spring Stampex, 2019.

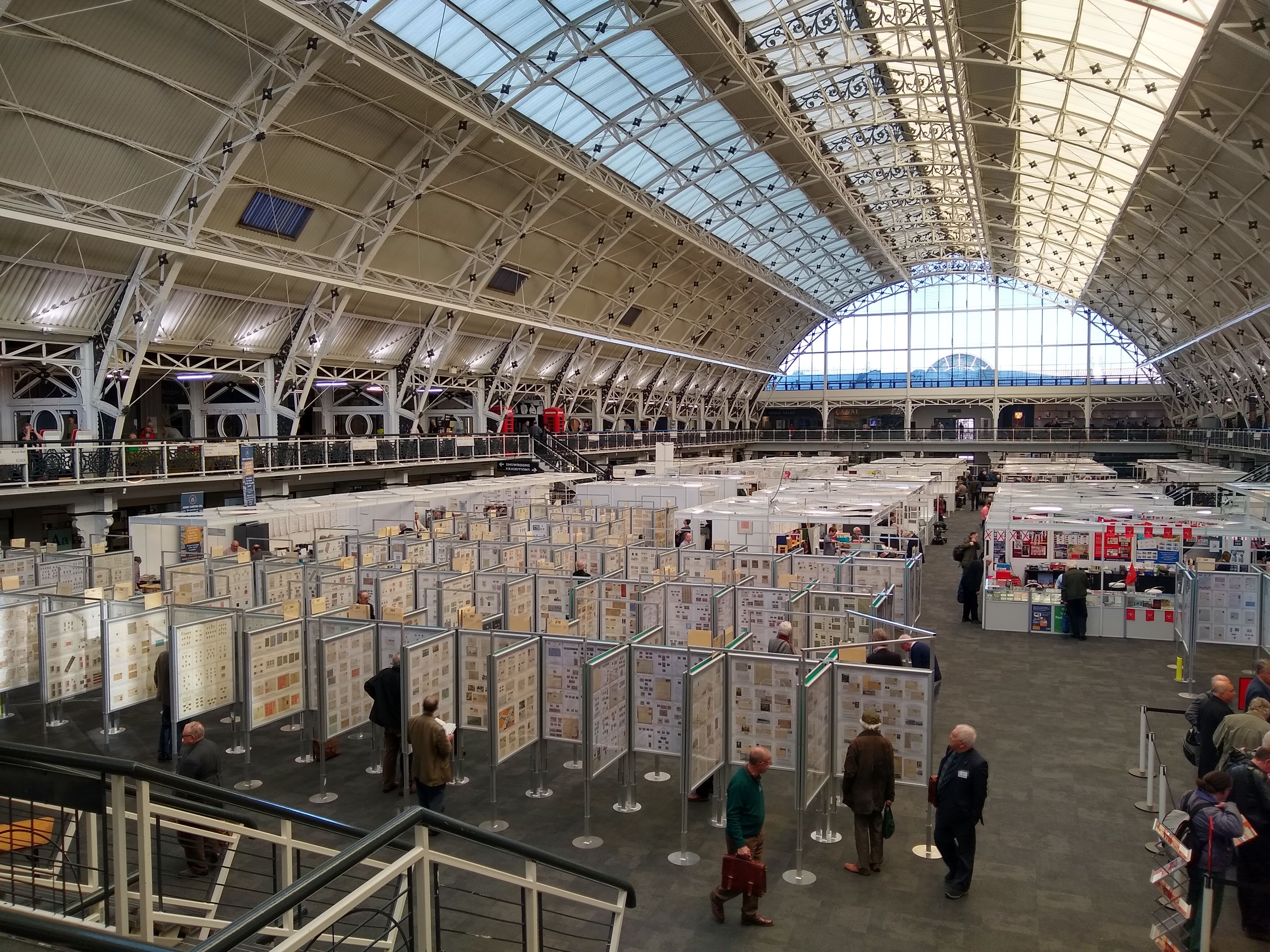
View from the west end of the hall showing the competitive exhibits, Spring Stampex 2019

Stampex is a British stamp show held at the Business Design Centre (BDC) in Islington, London. The show is organised by the Philatelic Traders Society (PTS) through their company The Philatelic Traders’ Society Limited company and has been running for many years.

== Elements of the show ==
The show includes stands of stamp dealers, auction houses, and others who are members of the PTS. There are also specialist philatelic societies meetings, Stampex Talks, Exhibiting and more.

There is a youth area run by the Stamp Active Network, formerly the National Youth Stamp Group.

== Tickets & Souvenirs ==
Admission is £10 on day one and free of charge for days 2, 3 and 4. Visitors to Stampex 2023 will receive a show handout. At the Spring 2009 show a postcard was given featuring unadopted artwork by stamp designer Jeffery Matthews for a proposed 1979 Welsh Assembly stamp issue.

== History ==
Stampex has not always been at the BDC. For many years it was located at the Central Hall, Westminster when it was organised between the PTS and The Junior Philatelic Society (now the National Philatelic Society).

The Jules Rimet Trophy was stolen from Westminster Central Hall while exhibited as part of a "Sport with Stamps" display during Stampex in March 1966. Stamps worth an estimated £3m were left behind. The trophy was subsequently recovered.

== Other British shows ==
There is no other regular national show competing with Stampex in the UK, although many smaller shows take place and an FIP endorsed international show takes place in London every ten years.

While the name has been adopted for stamp shows in other countries, such as Hong Kong Stampex and Adelaide Stampex, none however, are connected with the British version.

== See also ==
- List of philatelic exhibitions (by country)
