= Postage stamps and postal history of Ghana =

A 1959 stamp of Ghana showing Diamond mining

This is a survey of the postage stamps and postal history of Ghana, known as the Gold Coast before independence.

Ghana is located in West Africa, borders Côte d'Ivoire (Ivory Coast) to the west, Burkina Faso to the north, Togo to the east and the Gulf of Guinea to the south.

== Pre-stamp era ==
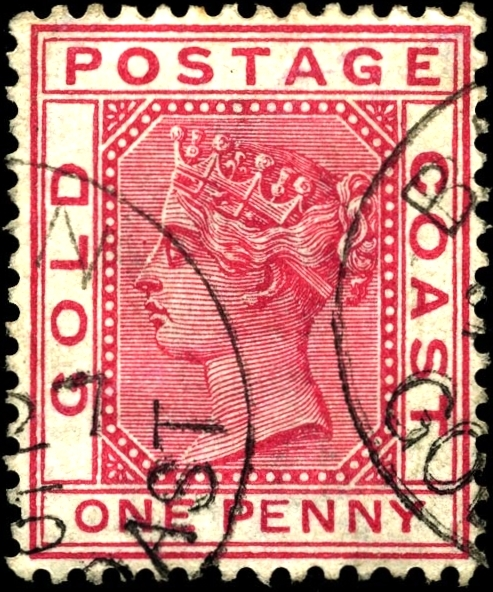
An early stamp of Gold Coast

The Gold Coast gradually came under British control by the middle of the nineteenth century and it was administered by Sierra Leone, further along the coast, until Gold Coast became a Crown Colony in 1874. Mails travelled via Freetown at this time. A postal service was established at Cape Coast Castle in 1853.

== Lagos ==
The settlement at Lagos on the coast of Southern Nigeria was under Gold Coast control between July 1874 and 13 January 1886 when it became a separate colony. It had previously been under Sierra Leone.

== First stamps ==
The first stamps of the Gold Coast were stamps of Queen Victoria issued 1 July 1875 and Gold Coast joined the Universal Postal Union in January 1879.

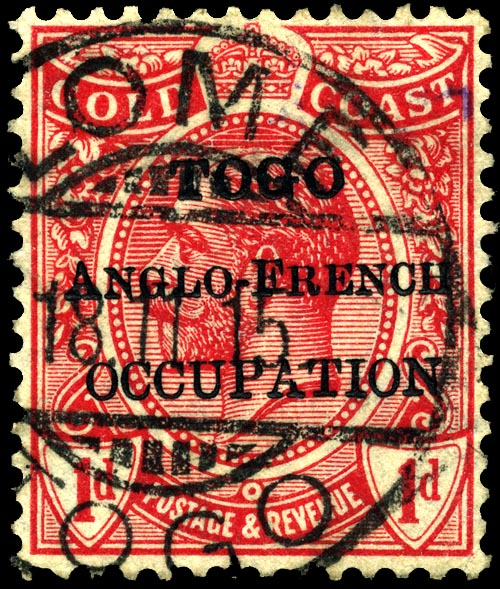
A stamp of Gold Coast overprinted for use in the British zone of occupied Togo

== World War Two ==
During World War Two, Gold Coast issued 1d and 6d war savings stamps. The stamps were registered in 1943 and copies exist in the Crown Agents Archives in the British Library Philatelic Collections.

== Allied occupation of Togo ==
In August 1914, German Togo was invaded by British troops from Gold Coast and French troops from Dahomey which occupied the territory until 1919. Overprinted stamps of Gold Coast were used in the British occupied zone of Togo. From 1922, the British zone was administered as part of Gold Coast.

== Independence ==
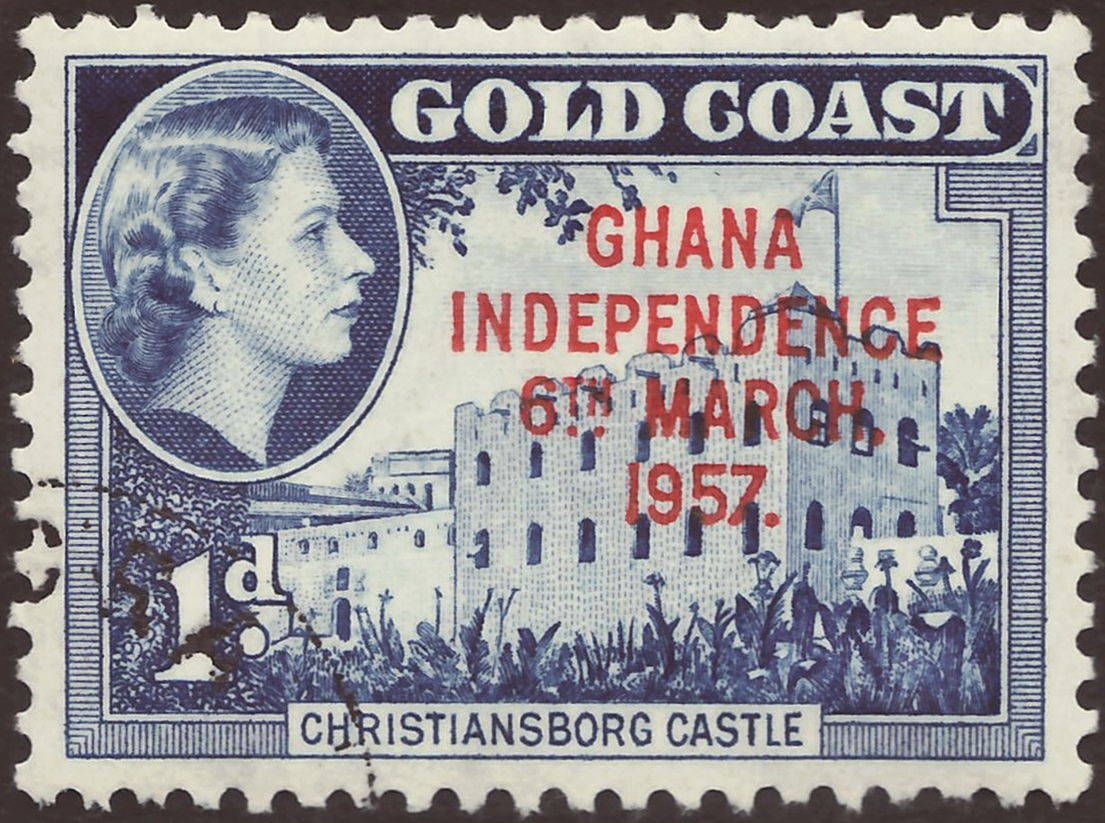
1957 Ghana Independence Issue

The first stamps of independent Ghana were issued in March 1957 and consisted of a commemorative stamp set of four and a definitive stamp series of 12 formed by overprinting former Gold Coast stamps with the words GHANA INDEPENDENCE 6th MARCH 1957. Regular issues have followed, including a number of sets of postage due stamps.

Ghanaian stamps after independence were noted for their bold colours and the frequent incorporation of the Ghanaian flag in their design. Ghana was the first country client of the Inter-Governmental Philatelic Corporation, however, inept handling of the early post-independence issues caused damage to Ghana's reputation in the philatelic world from which it has not yet recovered.

== See also ==
- Revenue stamps of the Gold Coast
- West Africa Study Circle
