= Michael Farrar-Bell =

British stained glass and postage stamp designer

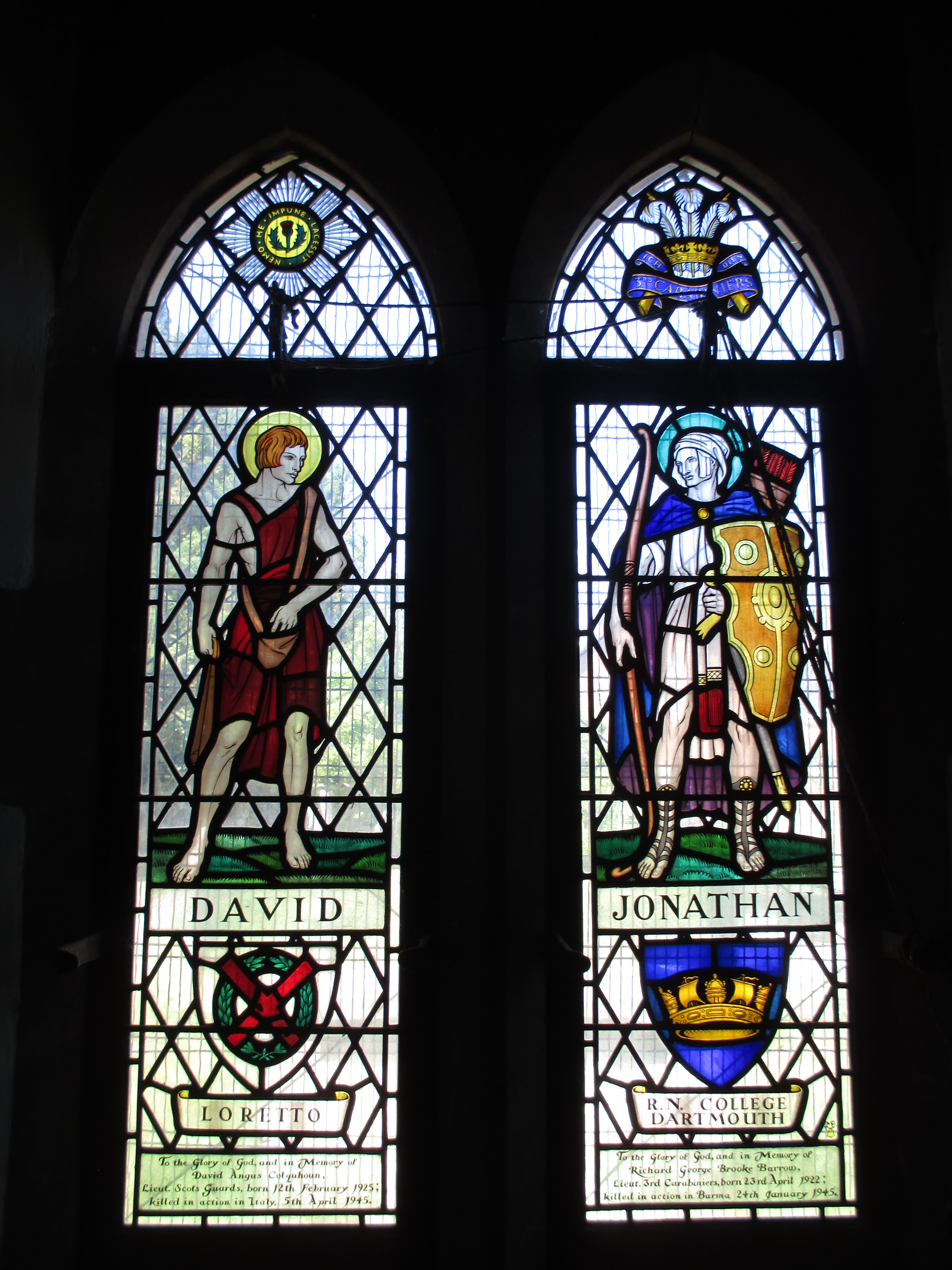
Stained-glass window by Farrar-Bell in St Mary's Church, Fittleworth, West Sussex

Michael Charles Farrar Bell, later Farrar-Bell (1911–1993) was a British stained glass and postage stamp designer.

Bell designed pub signs, then became known as a stained glass designer as the head of Clayton and Bell, which had been one of the most prolific workshops of English stained glass during the latter half of the 19th century.

Bell's postage stamp designs included the 1s/6d value of the British Coronation of Queen Elizabeth II 1953 stamp issue, the frame around the image of the Queen on two values of the Wilding series definitive stamp issue and the 3d value from the 1965 Salvation Army commemorative issue.

He was an accomplished artist, and a British Pathe News film of 1956 shows him at work, painting pub-signs.

Farrar-Bell worked alongside Deane Skurray, son of Thomas Skurray, chairman of Morland United Breweries, Abingdon. Together they designed a plaque that went in front of every Morland pub and hotel across Wiltshire, Oxfordshire, Berkshire, Hampshire, Surrey and London, to commemorate 250 years of brewing. Skurray had the idea of a painter in a red frocked coat tricorn hat, so with this idea Farrar-Bell put pencil to paper and together they came up with the design, which became the new logo of Morland & Co. These ceramic plaques were first made by Carter Tile Works in London and then the Poole pottery company, and still can be seen in more than 350 pubs across the Morland trading area, many in Abingdon, Reading, Oxford, Wantage, Maidenhead, Wokingham, Thame. Farrar-Bell also painted many of Morland's pub signs.
