= Wilding series =

UK postage stamp series

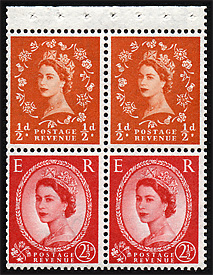
A pane from a postage stamp booklet showing two different stamps from the Wilding series.

The Wildings were a series of definitive postage and revenue stamps featuring the Dorothy Wilding photographic portrait of Queen Elizabeth II that were in use from December 1952 (they were the first UK stamps issued during her reign) until decimalisation in 1971. The Wildings were the first and only British stamps to feature graphite lines on the back, and the first to feature phosphor bands on the face – both aids to automation. The stamps were also the first British pictorial high value stamps and the first to include regional emblems.

== Design history ==
The stamps reproduced a portrait of Queen Elizabeth II taken during a photographic session on 26 February 1952 by Dorothy Wilding, who had been working at the Royal Court since 1937. Seventy five designs were considered to frame the portrait and five basic designs by Edmund Dulac, Enid Marx, Mary Adshead, Michael Farrar-Bell and George Knipe were selected. Four symbolic flowers of each country of the United Kingdom were also depicted, imitating one of the definitive stamp designs of King George VI's reign.

Dorothy Wilding's photograph depicts The Queen wearing the State Diadem made for George IV in the 1820s, which was designed to be worn outside a Cap of Maintenance. This diadem was also worn by Queen Victoria on stamps such as the Penny Black. The original photograph was re-touched to bring the diadem further forward on the Queen's head.

The replacement of the Wildings was initiated by stamp designers Michael Goaman and Faith Jacques. In a letter sent to the Post Office in April 1961, they expressed the difficulty of including the large Wilding portrait in their designs for commemorative stamps and the fact that the Queen was half turned to the viewer was also felt to be unsatisfactory. They proposed an image that would represent the monarchy more than the person of the queen. In 1963, comparing the Wilding portrait with Jacques' proposed design, the Stamp Advisory Committee acknowledged the need for a replacement, and in 1967 the stamps were replaced by the Machin head though the design continued to be used for regional issues until decimalisation in 1971.

== Low values ==
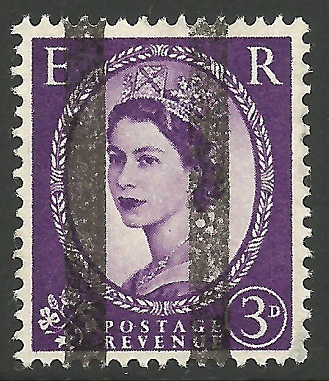
A 3d Wilding Overprinted with black bars for use as a training stamp, 1954 or later.

Eighteen values – in 1/2d increments up to 3d, 1d increments (plus 4 1/2d) up to 1s, 1s 3d and 1s 6d – were issued starting with the 1 1/2d and 2 1/2d on 5 December 1952. All were printed in photogravure by Harrison and all were perforated 15 (more accurately 14 3/4) × 14. Three separate watermarks were used:

- Tudor crown + E2R (1952 to 1954)
- St. Edward's crown + E2R (1955 to 1958)
- St. Edward's crown (1958 on)

For brevity these are known as 'Tudor Crown', 'St. Edward's Crown' and 'Crowns' (or 'Multiple crown') respectively. The Tudor crown watermark was replaced because the dandy roll was worn, and the St. Edward's Crown watermark was replaced because of the introduction of Scottish regional issues and perceived sensitivities as Elizabeth was the first Elizabeth to rule Scotland not the second.

As well as the normal upright watermark – on values up to and including 4d – the stamps are also found with inverted, sideways and sideways inverted watermarks from booklets and coils.

The original cream paper was changed to white from April 1962 resulting in two variants of the 'crowns' watermark stamps. The 6d is also sometimes found on slightly pinkish paper.

Several of the values are found in a variety of shades, the most obvious being a red brown and a dark red brown for the 2d and two distinct blues for the 4d. There are also two distinct dies of the 2 1/2d red, easily distinguished by the outlining of the central gem on the Queen's crown.

== Technical innovation ==
Automatic Letter Facing (ALF) was introduced on an experimental basis in 1957 so as to automatically orient envelopes for postmarking. The original system used graphite lines on the back of the stamp. This was later (1960) replaced by a system based on detecting phosphor bands on the face of the stamp following an intermediate stage of both phosphor and graphite lines. The first phosphor lines were 'green'. For technical reasons 'green' phosphor was replaced by 'blue' phosphor (1961) and finally 'violet' phosphor (1965). The significant distinguishing feature is the afterglow time – 'blue' 20 sec., 'green' 10 sec., 'violet' 5 sec. – rather than the colour as such.

== High values ==
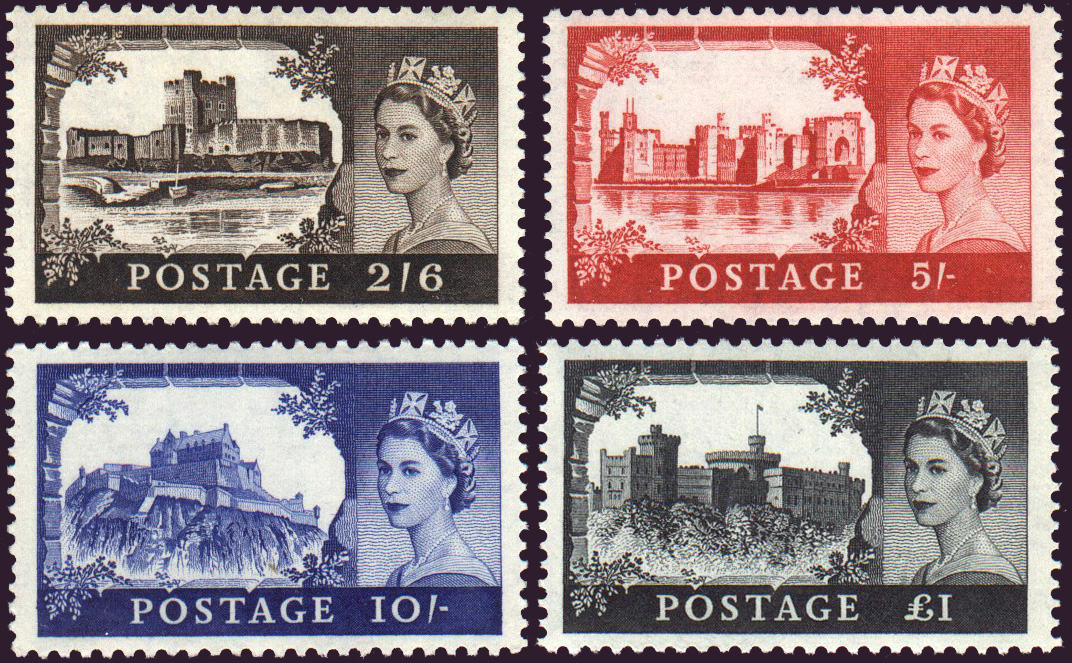
The castles high value definitive stamps of Great Britain.

In 1955 four large format high values – Castles – designed by L. Lamb were introduced. These were the first true British pictorials – previous designs, for example the 1953 Coronation issue, had all featured symbolic designs – and showed the Wilding head plus a castle. The four were:

- 2s 6d — Carrickfergus Castle
- 5s — Caernarvon Castle
- 10s — Edinburgh Castle
- £1 — Windsor Castle

All stamps were recess printed on a variety of papers. Three separate printers, Waterlow (up to 1957), De La Rue (1958 on) and Bradbury Wilkinson (1963 on), were used. Two watermarks – St. Edward's Crown and Crowns were used. All stamps were perforated 11 × 12 (more accurately 11 3/4).

== Regional issues ==
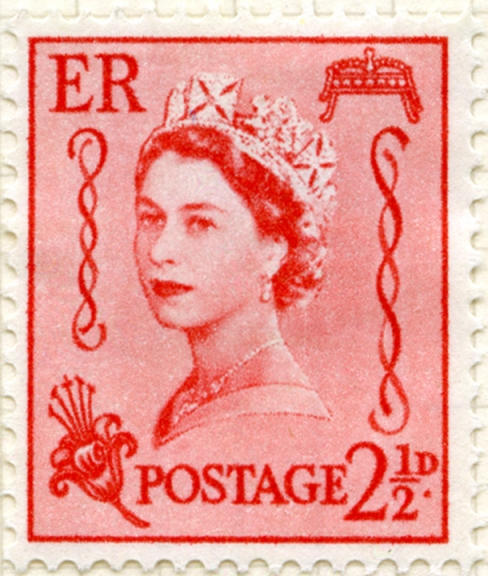
A British regional stamp for Guernsey.

Regional issues (also known as Country Definitives), for Northern Ireland, Scotland, Wales, Guernsey, Jersey and the Isle of Man, were first introduced in 1958. Whilst the Wilding head was common to all stamps the frames differed in that they incorporated regional symbols such as the Scottish thistle or the Welsh dragon. The stamps remained in use longer than the national Wildings. The Guernsey and Jersey stamps were withdrawn in 1969 when these islands became postally independent; the others at decimalisation. Due to this extended life later issues had no watermark – mirroring the Machins. Otherwise technical details are as for the national Wilding issues.

== Demonetizing ==
After the 1971 introduction of decimal currency, all postage stamps with pre-decimalization values were demonetized effective 1 March 1972. This included all the issues showing the Wilding design, except that £1 stamps of the 1952 high value series remained valid.

== Other uses ==
In addition to their use in the United Kingdom both low and high values were overprinted for use in North Africa (Morocco Agencies, Tangier) and the Middle East (Bahrain, Kuwait, Muscat, Qatar).

== Commemoration ==
In 1998, a commemorative booklet was produced by the British Post Office containing new Wilding stamps in decimal currency, and in 2002 and 2003 miniature sheets were issued each containing stamps in the Wilding style. The commemorative miniature sheet of definitives issued by the Royal Mail for the 2012 Diamond Jubilee of Elizabeth II included one stamp with photography by Dorothy Wilding based on the 1952 design by Edmund Dulac.
