= Self-adhesive stamp =

Self-adhesive postage stamp

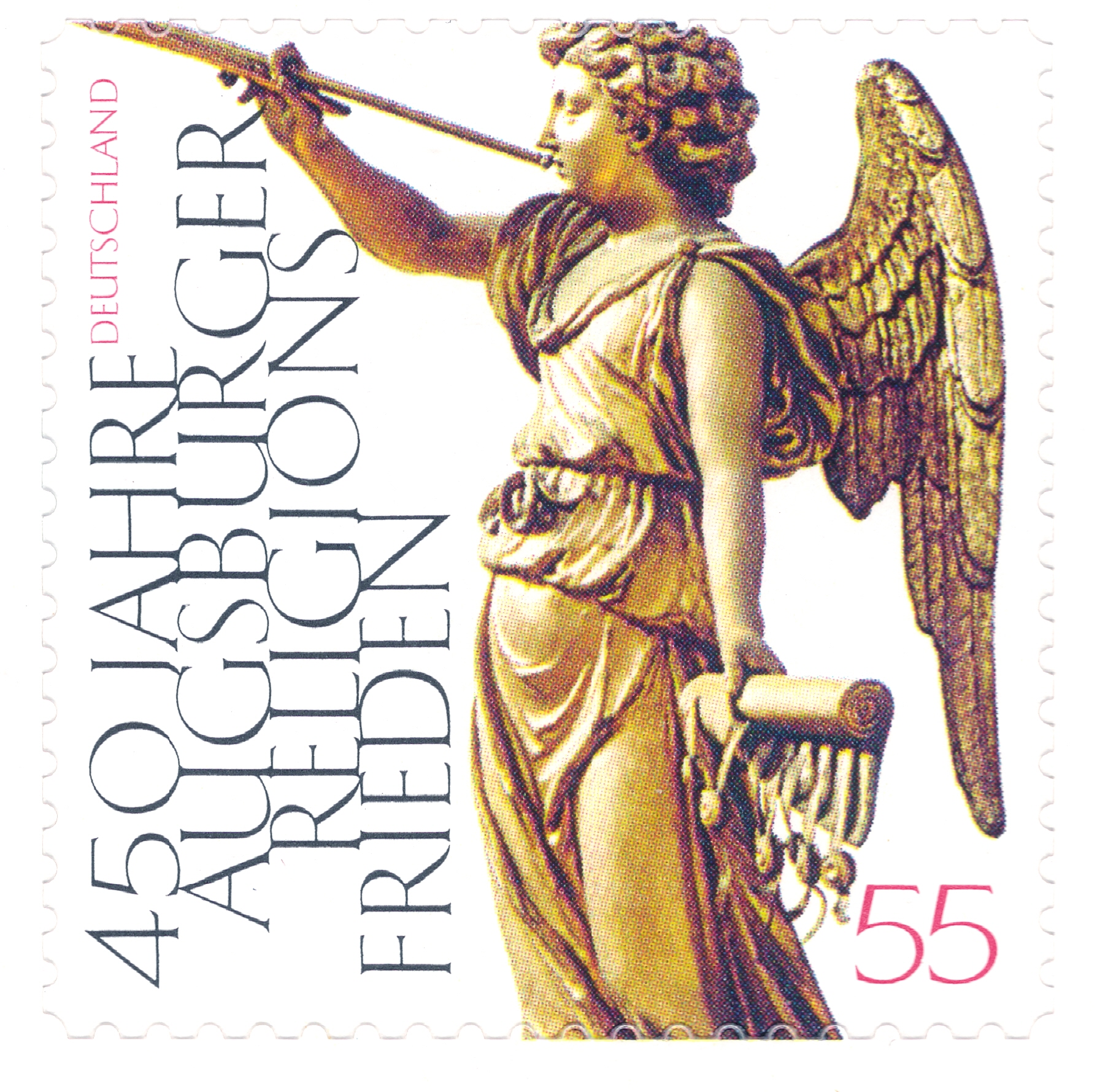
2005 self-adhesive stamp of Deutsche Post. (450 years after "Augsburger Religionsfrieden")

A self-adhesive stamp is a postage stamp with a pressure-sensitive adhesive that does not require moistening in order to adhere to paper. They are usually issued on a removable backing paper.

Stamp collectors have criticized the format, because the rubber-based adhesive used tends to yellow the stamps progressively. It makes stamps difficult to remove from covers, however various household solvents can be used to separate used self-adhesive stamps from their envelopes.

== First adhesive stamps ==
They were first issued by governments in tropical climates such as Tonga in July 1963 and Sierra Leone in February 1964 in an attempt to avoid the tendency of traditional water-activated stamps to stick together in humid conditions. They also made die cutting into fanciful and unique shapes easier.

== In the UK ==
The Royal Mail first issued self-adhesive stamps on 19 October 1993, with the introduction of booklets of 20 first class Machin stamps printed by Walsall Security Printers by offset lithography; later a second class stamp was introduced. In the years following, other issues were produced in the self-adhesive format.

Die-cutting tools for the UK self-adhesive stamps were manufactured by Arden Dies of Stockport, Cheshire, using tools designed by Robert Clapham.

== In the US ==
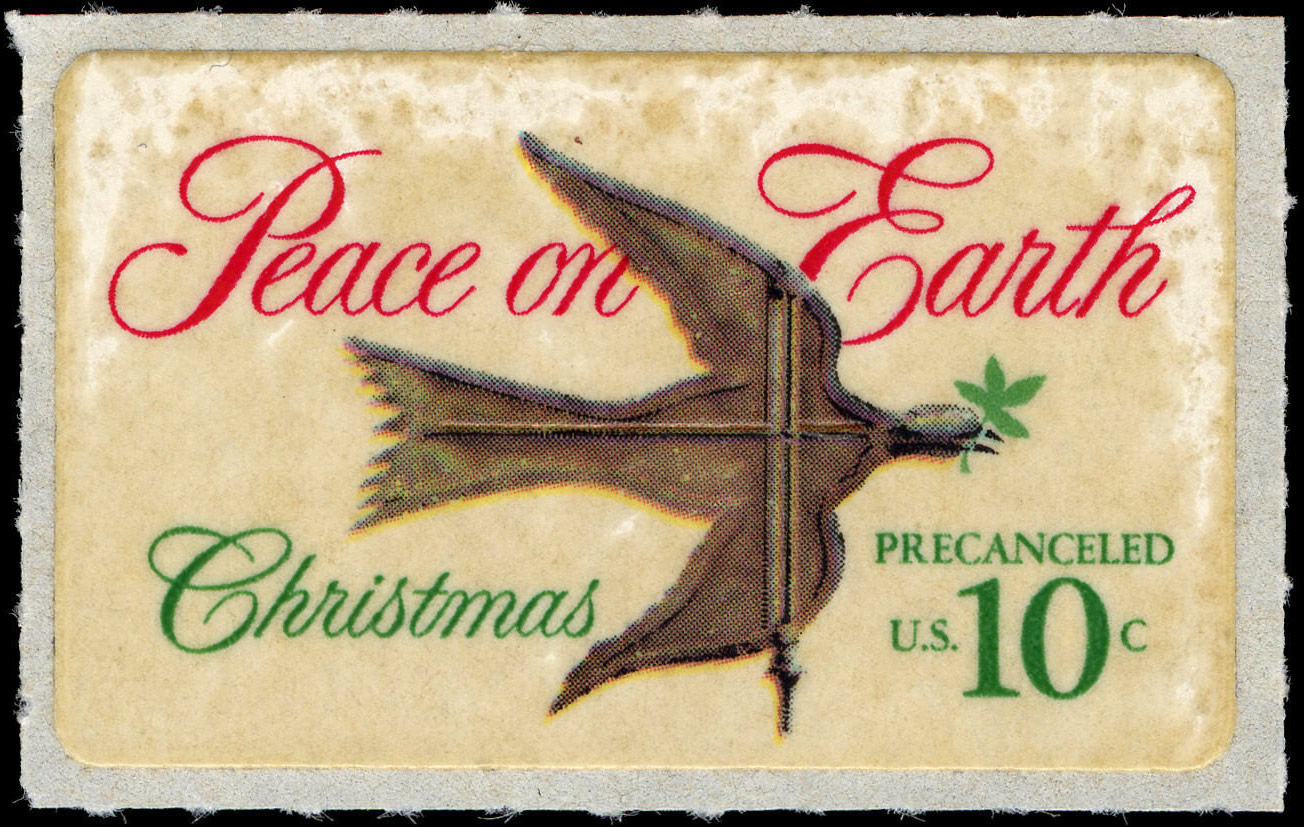
The first U.S. self-adhesive stamp

The United States Postal Service's first foray into self-adhesive stamps was in 1974 with the 10-cent dove weathervane, produced by Avery Dennison, that soon became discolored due to the instability of the adhesive. However, Avery Dennison continued adhesive technology research with pioneering work by M. Shams Tabrez, a chemist. It was in 1989 that another such self adhesive stamp was issued by the USPS. Outside of the philatelic community, the stamps have been welcomed as more convenient; by 2002, virtually all new USPS stamps were issued as self-adhesives.

More recent USPS self-adhesive stamps are not readily removable from the envelope or cover backing by traditional water soaking. Some collectors of used stamps have discovered that although not readily removable by water, the self-adhesives can be removed with Bestine (a heptane solvent), benzine (petroleum ether), or a natural based citrus solvent containing d-limonene (e.g., Pure Citrus Orange is an air freshener product that works for this purpose).

== See also ==
- Pressure-sensitive adhesive

Media related to Self-adhesive stamps at Wikimedia Commons
