= Revenue stamps of the Gold Coast =

Revenue stamps of the Gold Coast were issued by the British Colony of the Gold Coast (modern Ghana) between 1899 and the early 20th century. Dual-purpose postage and revenue stamps were used for most fiscal transactions, so few revenue stamps were issued.

The only revenue-only stamps of the Gold Coast were special printings of postage and revenue stamps in new colours, overprinted JUDICIAL to pay for court fees. The first set, depicting Queen Victoria, was issued in 1899. Another set depicting the new monarch Edward VII was issued in 1903. In 1907, some of the stamps from both the Victoria and Edward VII sets which were originally on yellow paper were reprinted on white paper.

Some of the high value postage and revenue stamps, such as the £2 stamp issued in 1921, were primarily intended for fiscal use.

The Gold Coast, now known as Ghana, is located in West Africa and is home to various Niger-Congo ethnic groups. Along the coast, the Fante people lived in small states that occasionally united when needed. Further inland were the Ashanti, who formed a powerful confederation in 1701. By the 19th century, this had evolved into a centralized kingdom covering much of central Gold Coast. Deeper inland, other smaller and less centralized communities existed.

== See also ==
- Postage stamps and postal history of Ghana
