= Jeffery Matthews =

British artist (1928–2023)

Jeffery Edward Matthews (3 April 1928 – 24 April 2023) was a British artist, specialising in postage stamp design from 1959 to 2007. He conceived the Machin definitive series' colour palette in the mid-1980s.

== Biography ==
=== Early years ===
Jeffery Edward Matthews was born on 3 April 1928 in London, England. At Brixton School of Building he learnt painting, decorating, interior design study, heraldry and letter typography, and with his friend Alan Harmer graphic design.

Forming a design studio with Alan Harmer who died in 1953, he then became an illustrator and created logotypes, graphic and typographic designs for public administration, firms (packaging for example) and book covers. He diminished these activities during the 1990s.

=== Stamp design ===
At the end of the 1950s, Matthews registered to the Council of Industrial Design, which proposed graphic artists to client entities. In 1959, he was amongst the designers the Council proposed to the Post Office; the British postal administration was looking for the design of two stamp series to mark its 300th anniversary. Matthews' project went up to submissions to Queen Elizabeth II. He was then regularly invited to propose stamp projects. His two first postage stamps were issued in 1965 for the 20th anniversary of the United Nations.

Matthews was regularly commissioned projects for stamps. From 1965 to 1998 nineteen issues (47 stamps and two sheet borders illustrated), and two miniature sheets in 2005 and 2007. His designs were chosen for six royal events and three philatelic ones: London 1980 International Stamp Exhibition stamp (one of the very few contemporary British stamps printed in intaglio) and the 150th Anniversary of the Penny Black mixing Queens Victoria and Elizabeth II head on the Machin definitive design.

His skills for heraldry permitted him to propose four stamps for the Welsh Assembly in 1978, that went unissued after the result of the 1979 Welsh devolution referendum. Nevertheless his skills were noted by the Post Office which entrusted him with three heraldic issues starting with four stamps for the Quincentenary of the College of Arms in 1984, four for the Order of the Thistle in 1987 and five for the Order of the Garter in 1998.

His final commemorative stamp works were the design of two minisheets for the 2005 End of Second World War and the 40th Anniversary of the Machin stamp series.

=== The Machin series ===
In the 1970s, he became involved in the designs of new Machin definitive stamps, picturing Queen Elizabeth II's profile since 1967. When ordered, he designed new symbols for the Regional Machins in 1971, with new digits (Narrower '0' and '½') and letters to match inflation of the postal rates in 1983.

Philatelic recognition came from his work on the Machin series colours. In 1976, he prepared the three colours needed for the photograved high value stamps. In the middle of the 1980s, he provided the Post Office with a large palette of colours, sufficient for the new next values. This work was honoured by a mini-sheet of eight stamps and two labels that Matthews designed, which were sold during the Stamp Show 2000.

Early 1980s Royal Mail chose him to design a new definitive design to replace the Machin head. Under the supervision of Post Office design adviser Barry Robinson, Jeffery Matthews prepared alternative essays from March 1982 pictures of the Queen by Lord Snowdon. Matthews used many different positions of the head and shoulders, from profile to full-face. Essays with the latter position were designed from the photographic representation and from a portrait drawn by his son Rory Matthews. But his and two other artists' proposals failed to please the Stamp Advisory Committee.

Matthews proposed some designs to reshape the Machin design into an horizontal format or with a barcode until Arnold Machin was presented with proposals that he refused. However some of Matthews' ideas were used for a horizontal autoadhesive stamp trial in 1997. He proposed a Machin head design with micro-printed text wavy line for the ten pound stamp of 1993 but Brian Craddock's Britannia was chosen.

=== Personal life and death ===
Matthews was married to Christine, who died in 1994. They had two children; a son, illustrator Rory Matthews, and a daughter, Sarah Jane.

Jeffery Matthews died on 24 April 2023, at the age of 95.

== Awards ==
- Member of the Most Excellent Order of the British Empire MBE 2004 for services to design
- Rowland Hill Award for Outstanding Contribution 2005
- Phillips Gold Medal for Stamp Design 2005
