= Douglas N. Muir =

British philatelist

Douglas N. Muir is the former Senior Curator of Philately at The Postal Museum in London, formerly the British Postal Museum & Archive and a signatory to the Book of Scottish Philatelists and the Roll of Distinguished Philatelists.

Muir was born in Balfron, Scotland, and subsequently attended Glasgow University where he studied geography and archaeology. His first job was as a language teacher in Pforzheim in Germany.

He worked as a philatelic journalist and Editor on Stamp Collecting, the Philatelic Magazine and then the British Philatelic Bulletin. He was also the founder of the Postal Mechanisation Study Circle. He has been a Trustee of the Stuart Rossiter Trust from 2013.

== Publications ==
- An Introduction to British Postal Mechanisation, Postal Mechanisation Study Circle, 1979. (With Martin Robinson)
- Postal Reform and the Penny Black: A New Appreciation, National Postal Museum, London, 1990. ISBN 0-9515948-0-X
- The Story of Definitive Stamps, Royal Mail, London, 1994. ISBN 0-946165-04-1 (With Richard West)
- The Transorma at Brighton, Postal Mechanisation Study Circle, 2006. ISBN 0-9521434-0-2
- A Timeless Classic: The Evolution of Machin's Icon, The British Postal Museum & Archive, 2007 ISBN 978-0-9553569-1-9
- George V and the GPO: Stamps, Conflict & Creativity, The British Postal Museum & Archive, 2010. ISBN 0-9553569-2-X
- King George V Printing Plates, GB Philatelic Pu (blications Ltd, 2015. ISBN 978-0-907630-28-9
- Return to Sender: The Retour Labels of Switzerland (in English & German), Schweizerische Vereinigung fuer Postgeschichte, 2018. (No ISBN)
- Just Large Enough: A Guide to The Postal Museum's Philatelic Collections, The Postal Museum, 2022. {ISBN|<978-1-3999-1273-0}
- The King-Emperor's Stamps 1910 - 1936: The Postage and Revenue Stamps & Postal Stationery of Imperial India under King George V Royal Philatelic Society, London, 2026 ISBN 978-1-913015-37-4 (softback) ISBN 978-1-913015-38-1 (hardback), (with Pragya Kothari Jain)

== Awards ==
- Royal Philatelic Society - Tapling Medal - Pictorial Definitives of Palestine
- Great Britain Philatelic Society - President's Cup for Research 1991, 2009, 2016
- Philatelic Congress of Great Britain - Kay Goodman lecture 2012
- Consilium Philateliae Helveticae - gold medal 2015
- Great Britain Philatelic Society - Literature Field Award 2023
