= John R. Holman =

British philatelist

John Richard Holman FRPSL (4 February 1950 - 10 June 2017) was the editor of the British Philatelic Bulletin from 1988 to 2010 and a fellow of the Royal Philatelic Society London.

Holman had been a philatelist since 1957 and his collecting interests include British private posts, postal stationery, postal labels, postmarks and government mail. He was the author of the long-running and popular "New Collector" series in Gibbons Stamp Monthly.

Holman was a former civil servant and a past employee of the stamp dealers Stanley Gibbons. His cousin was David Beech, curator of the philatelic collection at the British Library.
