= Phosphor banded stamp =

Phosphor bands are used on some postage stamps as a means to facilitate the mechanical sorting of mail. They were originally introduced in the Great Britain in 1959 as a replacement for the previous graphite lined stamps. Today, phosphor bands now widely used on stamps around the world.

In most designs a phosphorescent or fluorescent dye, which emits light under ultra-violet irradiation, is applied in vertical bands, or more recently, all over the stamp. This enables the mail sorting machine to face the mail and sort it into types. The color of the emitted light is determined by the chemical nature of dye. A large selection of dyes and colors are available commercially.
