= British Philatelic Bulletin =

- British Philatelic Bulletin
- Editor: Chloe Tuck (at time of closure)
- Categories: Philately
- Frequency: Monthly
- First issue: 1963
- Final issue: 2022
- Company: Royal Mail
- Country: United Kingdom
- Language: British English

The British Philatelic Bulletin was the official publication of the Royal Mail aimed at stamp collectors.

The Bulletin gave detailed information about future British stamp issues and also featured articles about past issues from noted philatelists.

== History ==
The Bulletin was first published in September 1963, not long after the formation of the Philatelic Bureau on 1 May, and was a monthly publication almost from the start. Early editions were simple publications, type-written on Bureau notepaper in A4 size. Later editions were professionally produced in colour in A5 size. Originally it was published by the GPO and then by the Royal Mail. The Royal Philatelic Society London (RPSL) has a complete archive of this publication and its index is available online.

The final issue of the Bulletin appeared in August 2022, completing the 59th volume.

== Editors ==
The editor at the time the Bulletin closed was Chloe Tuck. The precious editor was Tim Noble. The philatelist John Holman served as editor from 1988 to 2010, after which Kathryn Reilly took the reins. Previous editors included William Doherty, Frank Langfield, Archie Page, Frank Brench, John Memmott, Charles Gowen and Douglas Muir.

== Postmark Bulletin ==
A sister publication has been produced since 1971 known as the Postmark Bulletin. This provides a guide to upcoming British commemorative postmarks.
