= Crown Agents Philatelic and Security Printing Archive =

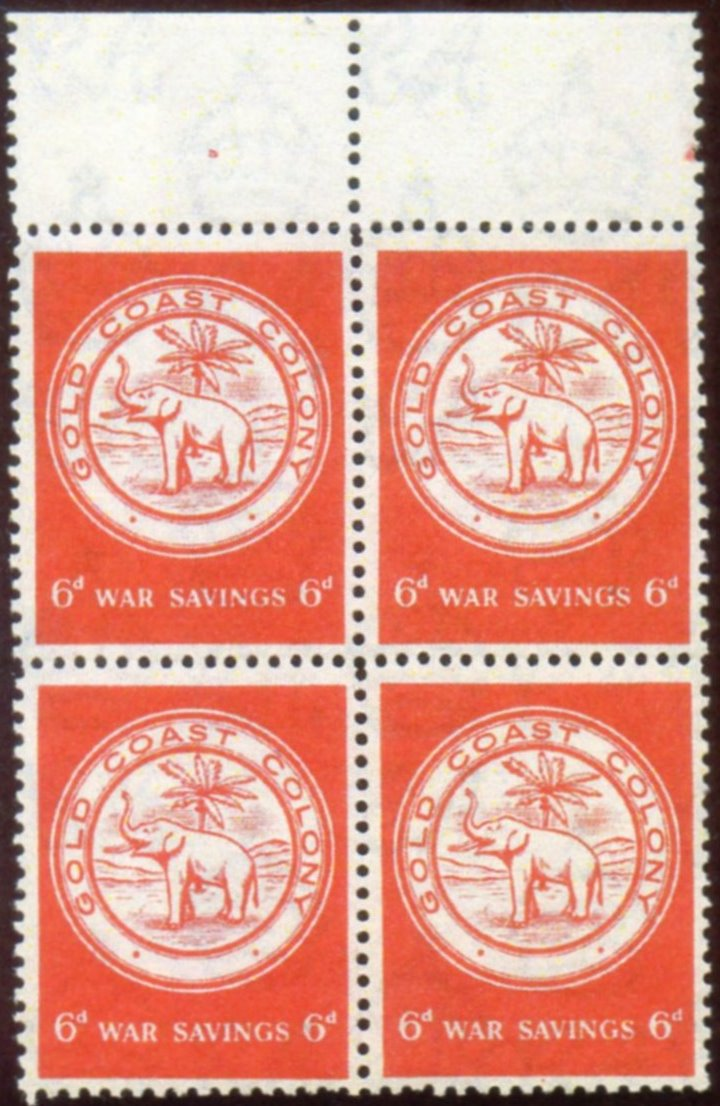
The 6d Gold Coast 1943 war savings stamp in a block of four (not from the archive). Examples of this stamp and a 1d in turquoise-blue are part of the archive.

The Crown Agents Philatelic and Security Printing Archive was deposited with the British Museum (later becoming the British Library) from the 1960s, though the first recorded deposit from the Crown Agents was in 1900. The archive consists of a range of philatelic and written material which were the Crown Agents' working records. It is the most comprehensive record of British Colonial and Commonwealth stamp issues of the last 100 years.

This is a current archive and is continually receiving deposits, mainly stamps, miniature sheets, stamp booklets, and proofs.

== Postage stamps ==
The Archive contains a number of the World's most notable postage stamp varieties, including for example, the Fiji 1878-99, 2d error of colour, being blue instead of green, and the Gold Coast 1889-94, Queen Victoria 20s. green and red.

Stamps that were never issued include the Malayan Union and Singapore Peace Commemorative stamps of 1946, which were not issued for local political reasons, and the Jamaica 1954 £1 Queen Elizabeth definitive in the design of the earlier King George VI issue. Also never issued, and included in the collection, are essays for four values (30c, 50c, 1s.30, 2s.50) of the 1960-62 Kenya, Uganda & Tanganyika definitive series overprinted to mark the 60th session of the International Olympic Committee in Nairobi, 1963. The stamps were discovered in the Archive for the first time in 2011.

There are revenue stamps from many territories, which because they were often only printed in small quantities, and few survive, are classed amongst the World's great philatelic rarities. Examples include the Nyasaland 1938 £10 King George VI revenue stamp, and the Swaziland £5 Queen Elizabeth II revenue stamp of 1956.

== Written records ==
The written records include requisition books for colonial government orders, circa 1921 to 1968, plate issue books for a similar period, and paper issue records from 1940 to the late 1960s.

The Archive contains examples of postal stationery, including postal orders and paper money printed in the United Kingdom mainly for British Commonwealth countries.

== See also ==
- British Library Philatelic Collections
- Crown Agents Collection

== References and sources ==
Sources

- Harris, Philip Rowland (1998), A history of the British Museum Library, 1753-1973, British Library, ISBN 978-0-7123-4562-0
