= Dorothy Wilding =

English professional portrait photographer

- Self-portrait (1930s)
- Born: 10 January 1893; Gloucester, England, United Kingdom
- Died: 9 February 1976 (aged 83)
- Occupation: Photographer
- Years active: 1914–1957
- Known for: Studio photography, celebrity portraits, royal family portraits
- Spouse: Tom Leighton-Pearce

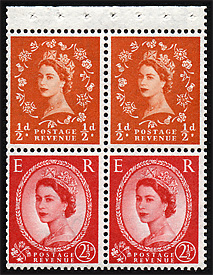
Booklet pane of Wilding series stamps

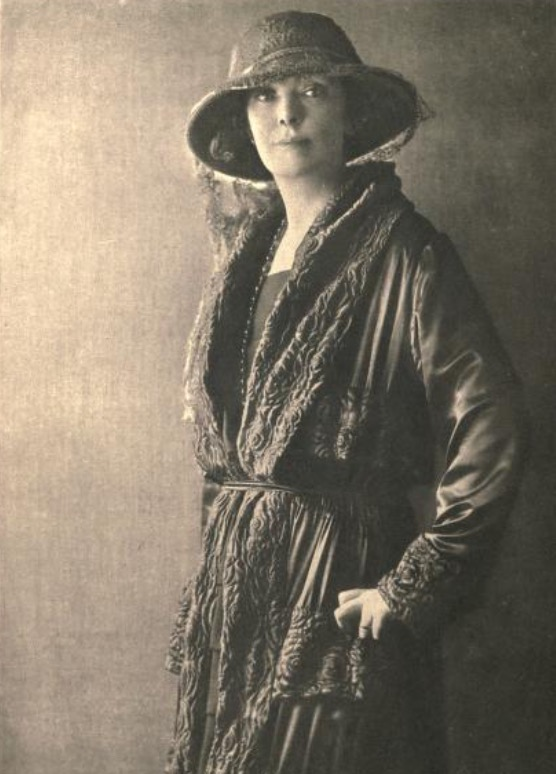
An early portrait, Lady Angela Forbes, photographed by Wilding in 1921

Dorothy Frances Edith Wilding (10 January 1893 – 9 February 1976) was an English professional portrait photographer from Gloucester, who established successful studios in both London and New York. She is known for her portraits of the British royal family, some of which were used to illustrate postage stamps, and in particular for her studies of actors and celebrities which fused glamour with modernist elegance. Val Williams noted Wilding's combination of business savvy and deep understanding of aesthetic impact: 'nobody knew better than Dorothy Wilding the power of the photograph to create or destroy the desired image.'

== Early life ==
Dorothy Wilding was born in Longford, a village on the edge of the City of Gloucester, in 1893. She wanted to become an actress or artist, but these careers were not encouraged by her uncle, in whose family she lived, so she chose instead photography, which she started to learn from the age of sixteen. Wilding obtained studio experience with the American portraitist Marion Nielson, before working as a re-toucher for Richard Speight in New Bond Street; in 1914, she opened her first studio.

== Career ==
By 1929 Wilding had already moved studio a few times and in her Bond Street studio attracted theatrical stars and shot her first British royal family portrait of the 26-year-old Prince George (later Duke of Kent) in 1928. Six years later Wilding was selected to take the official engagement photographs of Prince George before his marriage to Princess Marina of Greece. In 1935 a sitting booked for a Mrs Simpson on a Friday found Wilding away from the studio. Instead her leading deputy camera operator Maryon Parham took photographs of Wallis Simpson, the future Duchess of Windsor, who was accompanied to the studio by Edward, Prince of Wales at a time when the relationship was not mentioned in the British press. A hand-coloured image from this session would later appear on the cover of Time magazine, marking Wallis as "Woman of the Year".

Wilding opened a second studio in New York City on 56th Street in 1937. The studio was designed in collaboration with her architect husband Tom Leighton-Pearce. A further important series of royal sittings were also taken when Wilding was based in America. These were eventually followed by the famous Wilding portrait of the newly ascended Elizabeth II that was used for a series of definitive postage stamps of the United Kingdom used between 1952 and 1967, and a series of Canadian stamps in use from 1954 to 1962. A previous portrait sitting of Elizabeth Bowes-Lyon, wife of George VI, had turned into a double portrait of the royal couple and was adapted for the 1937 Coronation issue stamp. That portrait led to her being the first woman awarded a royal warrant to be the official photographer to a King and Queen at their coronation.

An autobiography, In Pursuit of Perfection, was published in 1958.

== Portraits ==
Besides members of the royal family, Wilding photographed many famous people, including filmstars and celebrities of the 1920s and 1930s. Her sitters included: Noël Coward, Jessie Matthews, Diana Wynyard, Harriet Cohen, Cecil Beaton, Vivien Leigh, George Bernard Shaw, Earl Mountbatten of Burma, Anna May Wong, Aldous Huxley, Dame Gladys Cooper, Tallulah Bankhead, Helen Wills Moody, Raymond Massey, Maurice Chevalier, Nancy Astor, Diana Wynyard, Douglas Fairbanks, Jr., Barbara Hutton. In her New York studio she photographed Fannie Hurst and Gertrude Lawrence at the time of her appearance in Pygmalion. In the 1940s and 1950s her subjects included Dame Barbara Cartland, Ralph Hancock. Dame Daphne du Maurier, Sir John Gielgud, Sir Norman Hartnell, Harry Belafonte, Louis Jourdan, Yehudi Menuhin, Somerset Maugham, Yul Brynner and Claire Bloom. Wilding is also known for her pictorial style nude photographs which include the dancer Jacqes Cartier and the artist's model Rhoda Beasley, photographed shortly before her early death.

== See also ==
- Bertram Park
- Wilding series stamps
