= Stamp Advisory Committee =

The Stamp Advisory Committee (SAC) is a committee to advise on the design of British postage stamps.

== History ==
The committee was originally established as an offshoot of the Council of Industrial Design in 1946. On 21 February 1968 a new Post Office appointed committee was set up and today the SAC advises the United Kingdom's Royal Mail on their stamp issuing policy.

== Work of the committee ==
Royal Mail select the subject of upcoming stamp issues and appoint designers to draw up a variety of different possible design for each issue. The committee then review the possible design and advise Royal Mail which they think is the best. The committee's recommendations are not binding on Royal Mail, nor does it select new subjects for stamp issues.

The committee is drawn from all walks of life but includes particularly designers, Royal Mail representatives and a British Government representative.

No guidelines for stamp issues are provided to either the SAC or Royal Mail.

The records of the SAC have been archived at the British National Archives along with other records of Royal Mail and its predecessors and are available for the public to view as the 30 year embargo elapses.

== Controversies ==
The subjects chosen for British stamps have often been controversial. In 1996 for instance, questions were asked in the House of Lords about the choice of a stamp showing the British children's television character Muffin the Mule over one showing the designer William Morris and a government minister was forced to explain that such choices were not part of the work of the SAC.

The choice of subjects for a set honouring 20th Century Women of Achievement was equally controversial.

And in 1965, Sir Kenneth Clark resigned as chairman of the committee in protest at the increasing commercialism of the Post Office's stamp issuing policy, saying "There had been a change of outlook in the production of stamps with which I was not in sympathy. .... I was afraid that the admission of pictorial stamps would lead to complete banality"
