= List of British postage stamps =

List of postage stamps issued by the United Kingdom

This is a list of British postage stamps issued by the Royal Mail postal service of the United Kingdom, normally referred to in philatelic circles as Great Britain. This list should be consistent with printed publications, and cite sources of any deviation (e.g., magazine issue listing newly found variations).

== Queen Victoria ==
=== Line engraved ===
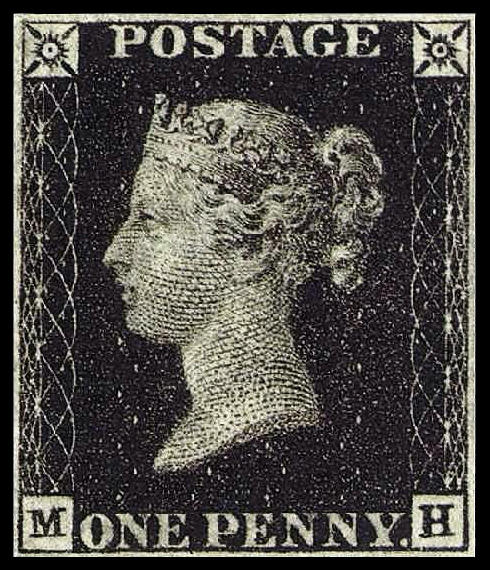

- One Penny Black issued on 1 May for use from 6 May 1840
- Penny Black VR official
- Penny Blue proof impression, never used
- Two Penny Blue contemporary issue with the Penny Black
- One Penny Red issued in 1841 to replace the Penny Black (the first issue with perforations from 1848)
- Prince Consort Essay
- Two Penny Blue printed in a new ink. The design has the addition of white * lines above and below the inscriptions
- Halfpenny Rose Red issued in 1870 for the reduced postcard and newspaper rate
- Three Halfpence Red introduced in 1870 for the reduced printed matter rate

=== Embossed ===
- Sixpence embossed, 1847–54
- Ten Pence embossed, 1847–54
- One Shilling embossed, 1847–54

=== Surface printed ===
- 4d, 6d, 1s, 1855–57 (no corner letters)
- 3d to 1s, 1862–64 (small white corner letters)
- 3d to 10d, 1865–67 (large white corner letters)
- 3d to 2s, 1867–80 (large white corner letters – new watermark)
- High value definitives, 5s to £5 1867–83
- Low value definitives, 1873–80 (coloured corner letters)
- Low value definitives, halfpenny to 5d 1880–81
- Penny Lilac 1881, the most issued Victorian stamp
- High value definitives, 2/6 to £1 1883–84
- Lilac and Green low value definitives 1883
- Jubilee issue postage stamps 1887–92

== King Edward VII ==
- Definitives halfpenny to £1, 1902 (printed by De La Rue & Co.)
- Definitives halfpenny to 4d, 1911 (printed by Harrison and Sons)
- Definitives 1 1/2d to £1, 1911–13 (printed at Somerset House)

== King George V ==
- Definitives halfpenny, 1d, 1911–12 "Mackennals" (designed by Bertram Mackennal)
- Definitives halfpenny, 1d, 1912 "Mackennals" (lion shaded)
- Low value definitives, 1912–24 (halfpenny to 1s)
- High value definitives, 1913–18, "Seahorses"
- Postage due stamps, 1914 (halfpenny to 1s)
- British Empire Exhibition Postage Stamps (first commemorative issue)
- Universal Postal Union Congress, London 10 May 1929 (halfpenny to twopence halfpenny and £1)
- Low value definitives, 1934–36 (halfpenny to 1s)
- High value definitives, 1934, "Seahorses" (re-engraved)
- Silver Jubilee 7 May 1935 (first issue to commemorate a royal event)

== King Edward VIII ==
- Edward VIII postage stamps

== King George VI ==
- Low value definitives (original dark colours)
- Low value definitives (pale colours)
- Low value definitives (changed colours)
- High value definitives (original square format)
- High value definitives (rectangular format) 1951
- Coronation 12 May 1937 (first issue to include the Queen's portrait as well as the King's)
- Centenary of the postage stamp 6 May 1940
- Victory 11 June 1946
- Silver wedding 26 April 1948 (first issue to commemorate a personal Royal occasion rather than a state event, £1 value was the first British stamp designed by a woman, Joan Hassall, and the issue is notable for the omission of the words 'postage' and 'revenue').
- Channel Islands Liberation 10 May 1948
- Olympic Games 29 July 1948
- Universal Postal Union (UPU) 10 October 1949
- Festival of Britain 3 May 1951

== Queen Elizabeth II (pre-decimalisation) ==
=== 1952–1954 ===
- Low value definitives known as Wildings, 5 December 1952, 31 August 1953, 15 October 1954

=== 1953 ===
- Coronation, 2 June

=== 1955 ===
- Castles high value definitives, 1 September, 23 September, reprinted 1958, 1963, 1967

=== 1957 ===
- World Scout Jubilee Jamboree, 1 August
- 46th Inter-Parliamentary Union Conference, 12 September
- Low value Wilding definitives with graphite-lines, 19 November (first graphite-lined issue)

=== 1958 ===
- Sixth British Empire and Commonwealth Games, Cardiff, 18 July

=== 1959 ===
- Low value Wilding definitives with phosphor bands, 18 November (first phosphor issue)

=== 1960 ===
- Tercentenary of Establishment of General Letter Office, 7 July
- First Anniversary of European Postal and Telecommunications Conference, 19 September

=== 1961 ===
- Centenary of Post Office Savings Bank, 28 August
- European Postal and Telecommunications (C.E.P.T.) Conference, Torquay, 18 September (first issue printed in more than two colours)
- Seventh Commonwealth Parliamentary Conference, 25 September

=== 1962 ===
Note: Issues between 1962 and 1966 inclusive are available in two varieties – with, and without, phosphor bands (which fluoresce in ultra-violet light). These were introduced to help sorting machines distinguish between first and second class letters automatically and the early examples with phosphor bands (up to the 1965 Salvation Army issue) are worth several times those without.

- National Productivity Year, 14 November

=== 1963 ===
- Freedom from Hunger, 21 March
- Centenary of the Paris Postal Conference, 7 May
- National Nature Week, 16 May
- Ninth International Lifeboat Conference, Edinburgh, 31 May
- Red Cross Centenary Congress, 15 August
- Opening of COMPAC (Trans-Pacific Telephone Cable), 3 December

=== 1964 ===
- Shakespeare Festival, 23 April

Note: First commemorative set to feature in an illustrated Presentation Pack, including mint stamps, with descriptive notes and protective covering. Also first set for which there was an official Post Office issue illustrated First Day Cover envelope and first set to commemorate a person from history.

- 20th International Geographical Congress, London, 1 July
- Tenth International Botanical Congress, Edinburgh, 5 August
- Opening of Forth Road Bridge, 4 September

=== 1965 ===
- Winston Churchill Commemoration (2 stamps, 4d & 1/3), 8 July
- 700th Anniversary of Simon de Montfort's Parliament (2 stamps, 6d & 2/6), 19 July
- Salvation Army Centenary, (2 stamps, 3d & 1/6), 9 August
- Centenary of Joseph Lister's Discovery of Antiseptic Surgery, (2 stamps), 1 September
- Commonwealth Arts Festival (2 stamps), 1 September
- 25th Anniversary of Battle of Britain (8 stamps + 4d values as block of 6), 13 September
- Opening of Post Office Tower (2 stamps), 8 October
- 20th Anniversary of UNO and International Cooperation Year (2 stamps), 25 October
- International Telecommunication Union (ITU) Centenary (2 stamps), 15 November

=== 1966 ===
- Burns Commemoration, 25 January
- 900th Anniversary of Westminster Abbey, 28 February
- Landscapes, 2 May
- World Cup Football Championship, 1 June
- British Birds, 8 August
- England's World Cup Football Victory, 18 August
- British Technology, 19 September
- 900th Anniversary of Battle of Hastings, 14 October
- Christmas 1966, 1 December (the first Christmas issue)

=== 1967 ===
- European Free Trade Association (EFTA), 20 February
- British Wild Flowers, 24 April
- British Paintings, 10 July
- Sir Francis Chichester's World Voyage, 24 July
- British Discovery and Invention, 19 September (last watermarked issue)
- Christmas 1967, 18 October and 27 November

Also this year, in two issues, the first Machin definitives (4d, 1s, and 1/9 in the first issue); the remaining values were issued later in 1967 (3d, 9d, and 1/6) and on two dates in 1968.

=== 1968 ===
- British Bridges, 29 April (synthetic PVA gum used from this issue)
- British Anniversaries, 29 May
- British Paintings, 12 August
- Christmas 1968, 25 November

=== 1969 ===
- British Ships, 15 January
- First Flight of Concorde, 3 March
- Anniversaries, 2 April
- British Architecture (Cathedrals), 28 May
- Investiture of The Prince of Wales, 1 July
- Gandhi Centenary Year, 13 August
- British Post Office Technology, 1 October
- Christmas 1969, 26 November

=== 1970 ===
- British Rural Architecture (4 stamps), 11 February
- Anniversaries (5 stamps), 1 April
- London 6 at 4d (Sun Life Assurance Co. of Canada, 6 stamps) May – rare, only four known in existence
- Literary Anniversaries (5 stamps), 3 June
- Decimal Currency: Machin design of 10p, 20p, 50p and £1 (4 stamps), 17 June
- Ninth British Commonwealth Games (3 stamps), Edinburgh, 15 July
- Philympia 1970 stamp exhibition (3 stamps), 18 September
- Christmas 1970 (3 stamps), 25 November

== Queen Elizabeth II (decimal currency) ==
=== 1971 ===
- Decimal Currency Machins: 1/2p, 1p, 1 1/2p, 2p, 2 1/2p, 3p, 3 1/2p, 4p, 5p, 6p, 7 1/2p, and 9p (12 stamps), 15 February
- "Ulster '71" Paintings (3 stamps), 16 June
- Literary Anniversaries (3 stamps), 28 July
- Decimal Currency Machin: 10p small format (1 stamp), 8 August
- British Anniversaries (3 stamps), 25 August
- British Architecture: Modern University Buildings (4 stamps), 22 September
- Christmas 1971 (3 stamps), 13 October

=== 1972 ===
- British Polar Explorers (4 stamps), 16 February
- General Anniversaries (3 stamps), 26 April
- British Architecture: Village Churches (5 stamps), 21 June
- Broadcasting Anniversaries (4 stamps), 13 September
- Christmas 1972 (3 stamps), 18 October
- Royal Silver Wedding (2 stamps), 20 November (first issue with "all over" phosphor)

=== 1973 ===
- British Entry into European Communities, 3 January
- British Trees (1st Issue), 28 February
- British Explorers, 18 April
- County Cricket 1873–1973, 16 May
- Artistic Anniversaries, 4 July
- 400th Anniversary of the Birth of Inigo Jones (architect and designer), 15 August
- 19th Commonwealth Parliamentary Conference, 12 September
- Royal Wedding, 14 November
- Christmas, 28 November

=== 1974 ===
- British Trees (2nd issue), 27 February
- Bicentenary of the Fire Prevention (Metropolis) Act, 24 April
- Centenary of Universal Postal Union, 12 June
- Medieval Warriors, 10 July
- Birth Centenary of Winston Churchill, 9 October
- Christmas, 27 November

=== 1975 ===
- Health and Handicap Funds, 22 January
- Birth Bicentenary of J. M. W. Turner (painter), 19 February
- European Architectural Heritage Year, 23 April
- Sailing, 11 June
- 150th Anniversary of Public Railways, 13 August
- 62nd Inter-Parliamentary Union Conference, 3 September
- Birth Bicentenary of Jane Austen (novelist), 22 October
- Christmas, 26 November

=== 1976 ===
- Telephone Centenary, 10 March
- Social Reformers, 28 April
- Bicentenary of American Revolution, 2 June
- Centenary of Royal National Rose Society, 30 June
- British Cultural Traditions, 4 August
- 500th Anniversary of British Printing, 29 September
- Christmas, 24 November

=== 1977 ===
- Racket Sports, 12 January
- Centenary of Royal Institute of Chemistry, 2 March
- Silver Jubilee, 11 May
- Commonwealth Heads of Government Meeting 1977, London, 8 June
- British Wildlife, 5 October
- Christmas, 23 November

=== 1978 ===
- Energy Resources, 25 January
- British Architecture: Historic Buildings (4 stamps + MS), 1 March
- 25th Anniversary of Coronation, 31 May
- Horses, 5 July
- Centenaries of Cyclists Touring Club and British Cycling Federation, 2 August
- Christmas, 22 November

=== 1979 ===
- Dogs, 7 February
- Spring Wild Flowers, 21 March
- First Direct Elections to European Assembly, 9 May
- Horseracing paintings and Bicentenary of The Derby, 6 June
- International Year of the Child (4 stamps), 11 July
- Death Centenary of Sir Rowland Hill (4 stamps and Minisheet including all four stamps), 22 August
- 150th Anniversary of Metropolitan Police, 26 September
- Christmas 1979, 21 November

=== 1980 ===
- Centenary of Wild Bird Protection Act (4 stamps), 16 January
- 150th Anniversary of Liverpool and Manchester Railway (5 stamps + strip of 5), 12 March
- London 1980: International Stamp Exhibition (1 stamp and Minisheet), 9 April
- London Landmarks (5 stamps), 7 May
- Famous Authoresses (4 stamps), 4 July
- 80th Birthday of Queen Elizabeth the Queen Mother (1 stamp), 4 August (first issue to commemorate a Royal birthday)
- British Conductors (4 stamps), 10 September
- Sport Centenaries (4 stamps), 10 October
- Christmas 1980 (5 stamps), 19 November

=== 1981 ===
- Folklore (4 stamps), 6 February
- International Year of the Disabled (4 stamps), 25 March
- Butterflies (4 stamps), 13 May
- 50th Anniversary of the National Trust for Scotland (5 stamps), 24 June
- Wedding of Charles, Prince of Wales and Lady Diana Spencer (2 stamps), 22 July
- 25th Anniversary of Duke of Edinburgh's Award Scheme (4 stamps), 12 August
- Fishing Industry (4 stamps), 23 September
- Christmas (Children's paintings) (5 stamps), 18 November

=== 1982 ===
- Charles Darwin (4 stamps), 10 February
- Youth Organisations (4 stamps), 24 March
- British Theatre (4 stamps), 28 April
- ??? Pack number 135
- Maritime Heritage (5 stamps), 16 June
- British Textiles (4 stamps), 23 July
- Information Technology (2 stamps), 8 September
- British Motor Cars (4 stamps), 13 October
- Christmas (Carols) (5 stamps),17 November

=== 1983 ===
- British River Fishes (4 stamps), 26 January
- Commonwealth Day Monday 14 March (4 stamps), 9 March
- British Engineering Achievements (3 stamps), 25 May
- The British Army (5 Stamps), 6 July
- British Gardens (4 stamps), 24 August
- British Fairs (4 stamps), 5 October
- Christmas (5 stamps), 16 November

=== 1984 ===
- Heraldry (4 stamps), 17 January
- Cattle (5 stamps), 6 March
- Urban Renewal (4 stamps), 10 April
- Europa, CEPT 25th anniversary The Second European Election (2 strips of 2 stamps), 15 May
- Greenwich 1884– Meridian −1984 (4 stamps), 26 June
- The Royal Mail (strip of 5 stamps), 31 July
- The British Council 1934 – 1984 (4 stamps), 25 September
- Christmas (The Nativity) (5 stamps), 20 November

=== 1985 ===
- Famous Trains (5 stamps), 22 January
- Insects (5 stamps), 12 March
- British Composers (4 stamps), 14 May
- Safety at Sea (4 stamps), 18 June
- Royal Mail (4 stamps), 30 July
- Arthurian Legend (4 stamps), 3 September
- British Films (5 stamps), 8 October
- Christmas (Pantomime) (5 stamps), 19 November

=== 1986 ===
- Industry Year (4 stamps), 14 January
- Halley's Comet (4 stamps), 18 February
- 60th Birthday of Queen Elizabeth II (4 stamps, 2×2 se-tenant), 21 April
- Europa - Nature Conservation, Endangered Species (4 stamps), 20 May
- Medieval Life (4 stamps), 17 June
- Sport (5 stamps), 15 July
- Royal Wedding of Prince Andrew, Duke of York and Sarah Ferguson (2 stamps), 22 July
- Commonwealth Parliamentary Conference, (1 stamp), 19 August
- Royal Air Force, (5 stamps), 16 September
- Christmas (Traditions) (6 stamps), 18 November

=== 1987 ===
- Flowers, (4 stamps), 6 January
- Sir Isaac Newton, (4 stamps), 24 March
- British Architects in Europe, (4 stamps), 12 May
- St John Ambulance, (4 stamps), 16 June
- Scottish Heraldry, (4 stamps), 21 June
- Victorian Britain, (4 stamps), 8 September
- Studio Pottery, (4 stamps), 13 October
- Christmas, (5 stamps), 17 November

=== 1988 ===
- Bicentenary of Linnean Society, (4 stamps), 19 January
- 400th Anniversary of the Welsh Bible, (4 stamps), 1 March
- Sports Organisations, (4 stamps), 22 March
- Transport and Mail Services, Europa, (4 stamps), 10 May
- Australian Bicentenary (4 stamps), 21 June
- Spanish Armada, (5 stamps), 19 July
- Centenary of death of Edward Lear, (4 stamps), 6 September
- Castle high value definitives, (4 stamps), 18 October
- Christmas, (5 stamps), 15 November

=== 1989 ===
- Centenary of the Royal Society for the Protection of Birds, (4 stamps), 17 January
- Greetings stamps, (5 stamps), 31 January
- Food and Farming Year, (4 stamps), 7 March
- 150th anniversary of Public Education in England, (4 stamps), 11 April
- Anniversaries & Events, (4 stamps), 11 April
- Toys and Games, Europa, (4 stamps), 16 May
- Industrial Archaeology, (4 stamps), 4 July
- 150th Anniversary of the Royal Microscopical Society, (4 stamps), 5 September
- Lord Mayor's Show, (5 stamps), 17 October
- 800th Anniversary of Ely Cathedral, (5 stamps), 14 November

=== 1990 ===
- 150th Anniversary of Royal Society for the Prevention of Cruelty to Animals, 23 January
- Greetings Booklet Stamps - "Smiles", 6 February
- Europa and "Glasgow 1990 European City of Culture", 6 March
- 25th Anniversary of Queen's Award for Export and Technology, 10 April
- "Stamp World London 90" International Stamp Exhibition, London, 3 May
- 150th Anniversary of Kew Gardens, 5 June
- 150th Birth Anniversary of Thomas Hardy (author), 10 July
- 90th Birthday of Queen Elizabeth the Queen Mother, 2 August
- Gallantry Awards, 11 September
- Astronomy, 16 October
- Christmas, 13 November

=== 1991 ===
- Dogs - Paintings by George Stubbs, 8 January
- Greetings Booklet Stamps "Good Luck", 6 February
- Scientific Achievements, 5 March
- Greetings Booklet Stamps - "Smiles", 26 March
- Europa - Europe in Space, 23 April
- World Student Games, Sheffield and World Cup Rugby Championship, London, 11 June
- 9th World Congress of Roses, Belfast - Wood engravings by Yvonne Skargon, 16 July
- 150th Anniversary of Dinosaurs Identification by Owen, 28 August
- Bicentenary of Ordnance Survey. Maps of Hamstreet, Kent, 17 September
- Christmas - Illustrated Manuscripts from the Bodleian Library, Oxford, 12 November

=== 1992 ===
- The Four Seasons: Winter time, 14 January
- Greeting Stamps - Memories, 28 January
- 40th Anniversary of Accession, 6 February
- Death Centenary of Alfred, Lord Tennyson, 10 March
- Europa - International Events, 7 April
- 350th Anniversary of the Civil War, 16 June
- 150th Birth Anniversary of Sir Arthur Sullivan, Gilbert and Sullivan Operas, 21 July
- Protection of the Environment. Children's Paintings, 15 September
- Single European Market, 13 October
- Christmas 1992 - Stained Glass Windows, 10 November

=== 1993 ===
- 600th Anniversary of Abbotsbury Swannery, 19 January
- Greeting Stamps - "Gift Giving", 2 February
- 300th Birth Anniversary of John Harrison (inventor of the marine chronometer). Details of the "H4" clock, 16 February
- 14th World Orchid Conference, Glasgow, 16 March
- Europa - Contemporary Art, 11 May
- Roman Britain, 15 June
- Inland Waterways, 20 July
- The Four Seasons. Autumn - Fruits and Leaves, 14 September
- Sherlock Holmes - Centenary of the Publication of The Final Problem, 12 October
- Christmas - 150th Anniversary of Publication of A Christmas Carol, 9 November

=== 1994 ===
- The Age of Steam - Railway Photographs by Colin Gifford, 18 January
- Greeting Stamps - "Messages", 1 February
- Postage due stamps, 15 February (the final issue of postage due stamps that had been introduced in 1914)
- 25th Anniversary of Investiture of The Prince of Wales - Paintings by The Prince of Wales, 1 March
- Centenary of Picture Postcards, 12 April
- Opening of Channel Tunnel, 3 May
- 50th Anniversary of D-Day, 6 June
- Scottish Golf Courses, 5 July
- The Four Seasons - Summer time Events, 2 August
- Europa - Medical Discoveries, 27 September
- Christmas - Children's Nativity Plays, 1 November

=== 1995 ===
- Cats, 17 January
- The Four Seasons - Springtime, Plant Sculptures by Andy Goldsworthy, 14 March
- Greetings Stamp - "Greetings in Arts", 21 March
- Centenary of National Trust, 11 April
- Europa - Peace and Freedom, 2 May
- Science fiction - Novels by H. G. Wells, 6 June
- Reconstruction of Shakespeares Globe Theatre, 8 August
- Pioneers of Communications, 5 September
- Centenary of Rugby league, 3 October
- Christmas - Christmas Robins, 30 October

=== 1996 ===
- Death Bicentenary of Robert Burns (Scottish poet), 25 January
- Greetings Stamps - Cartoons, 26 February
- 50th Anniversary of the Wildfowl and Wetlands Trust - Bird Paintings by C.F. Tunnicliffe, 12 March
- Centenary of Cinema, 16 April
- European Football Championship, 14 May
- Olympic and Paralympic Games, Atlanta, 9 July
- Europa - Famous Women, 6 August
- 50th Anniversary of Children's Television, 3 September
- Classic Sports Cars, 1 October
- Christmas, 28 October

=== 1997 ===
- Greetings Stamps - 19th-century Flower Paintings, 6 January
- 450th Death Anniversary of King Henry VIII, 21 January
- Religious Anniversaries, 11 March
- Europa - Tales and Legends - Horror Stories, 13 May
- Architects of the Air - British Aircraft Designers, 10 June
- "All The Queens Horses" - 50th Anniversary of the British Horse Society, 8 July
- Sub-Post Offices, 12 August
- Birth Centenary of Enid Blyton (children's author), 9 September
- The Golden Wedding Anniversary 1947–1997, 7 October
- Christmas - Christmas Crackers, 27 October

=== 1998 ===
- Endangered Species, 20 January
- Diana, Princess of Wales Commemoration, 3 February
- 650th Anniversary of the Order of the Garter - The Queen's Beasts, 24 February
- Lighthouses, 24 March
- Comedians, 23 April
- Health - 50th Anniversary of National Health Service, 23 June
- Classic Fantasy Books for Children - Magical Worlds, 21 July
- Europa - Festivals, Notting Hill Carnival, 25 August
- Speed - British Land Speed Record Holders, 29 September
- Christmas - Angels, 2 November

=== 1999 ===
- Millennium stamp Series - The Inventors' Tale, 12 January
- Millennium stamp Series - The Travellers' Tale, 2 February
- Millennium stamp Series - The Patients's Tale, 2 March
- Millennium stamp Series - The Settlers' Tale, 6 April
- Millennium stamp Series - The Workers' Tale, 4 May
- Millennium stamp Series - The Entertainers' Tale, 1 June
- Royal wedding, 15 June
- Millennium stamp Series - The Citizens' Tale, 6 July
- Millennium stamp Series - The Scientists' Tale, 3 August
- Solar Eclipse, 11 August
- Millennium stamp Series - The Farmers' Tale, Includes 1999 Europa issue, 7 September
- Millennium stamp Series - The Soldiers' Tale, 5 October
- Millennium stamp Series - The Christians' Tale, 2 November
- Millennium stamp Series - The Artists' Tale, 7 December
- Millennium stamp Series - 'Millennium Timekeeper', 14 December

=== 2000 ===
- New Millennium stamp, 6 January
- Millennium stamp Projects (1st Series) - "Above and Beyond", 18 January
- Millennium stamp Projects (2nd Series) - "Fire and Light", 1 February
- Millennium stamp Projects (3rd Series) - "Water and Coast", 7 March
- Millennium stamp Projects (4th Series) - "Life and Earth", (2nd) ECOS Ballymena, (1st) Web of Life Exhibition at London Zoo, 44p Earth Centre Doncaster, 64p Project SUZY Teesside. Printed by De La Rue Security Print, 4 April
- Millennium stamp Projects (5th Series) - "Art and Craft", 2 May
- "Stamp Show 2000" International Stamp Exhibition, London, "Her Majesty's Stamps", 23 May
- Millennium stamp Projects (6th Series) - "People and Places", 6 June
- Millennium stamp Projects (7th Series) - "Stone and Soil", 4 July
- Millennium stamp Projects (8th Series) - "Tree and Leaf", 1 August
- Queen Elizabeth the Queen Mother's 100th Birthday, 4 August
- Millennium stamp Projects (9th Series) - "Mind and Matter", 5 September
- Millennium stamp Projects (10th Series) - "Body and Bone", 3 October
- Millennium stamp Projects (11th Series) - "Spirit and Faith", 7 November
- Millennium stamp Projects (12th Series) - "Sound and Vision", 5 December

=== 2001 ===
- The Millennium stamp, 16 January
- Centenary of the Death of Queen Victoria, 29 January
- Silver hallmarks, 6 February
- Cats and Dogs, 13 February
- Northern Ireland Definitives, 6 March
- Weather, 12 March
- Centenary of the Royal Navy Submarine Service, 10 April
- England Definitives, 23 April
- Double-decker Buses, 15 May
- Fabulous Hats, 19 June
- Smiles, 3 July
- Pond Life, 10 July
- Puppets, Punch and Judy, 4 September
- Centenary of the Nobel Prizes, 2 October
- Centenary of the Royal Navy Submarine Service, Flags 22 October
- Christmas - Robins 6 November

=== 2002 ===
- Centenary of Publication of Rudyard Kipling's Just So Stories, 15 January
- Golden Jubilee, 6 February
- Wilding Definitive of 1952–54, 6 February
- Greetings Stamps "Occasions", 5 March
- British Coastlines, 19 March
- Europa - Circus, 10 April
- Queen Elizabeth the Queen Mother Commemoration, 25 April
- 50th Anniversary of Passenger Jet Aviation, 2 May
- World Cup Football Championship, Japan and Korea, 21 May
- 17th Commonwealth Games, Manchester, 16 July
- 150th Anniversary of Great Ormond Street Children's Hospital, 20 August
- Bridges of London, 10 September
- Astronomy Sheet, 24 September
- 150th Anniversary of the First Pillar Box, 8 October
- Christmas 2002, 5 November
- 50th Anniversary of Wilding Definitives sheet, 5 December

=== 2003 ===
- Birds of Prey, 14 January
- Greetings Stamps "Occasions", 4 February
- 50th Anniversary of Discovery of DNA, 25 February
- Fruit and Vegetables, 25 March
- Overseas Booklet Stamps, 27 March
- Extreme Endeavours (British Explorers), 29 April
- 50th Anniversary of Coronation, 2 June
- 21st Birthday of Prince William of Wales, 17 June
- A British Journey, Scotland, 15 July
- Europa, British Pub Signs, 12 August
- Classic Transport Toys, 18 September
- 250th Anniversary of the British Museum, 7 October
- Christmas 2003, 4 November
- England's Victory in Rugby World Cup sheet, 19 December

=== 2004 ===
- Classic locomotives, 13 January
- Occasions 2004, 3 February
- The Lord of the Rings, 26 February
- Northern Ireland, 16 March
- Entente Cordiale, 6 April
- Ocean Liners, 13 April
- Royal Horticultural Society, 25 May
- Wales, 15 June
- Royal Society of Arts, 10 August
- Woodland Animals, 16 September
- Crimea, 12 October
- Christmas 2004, 2 November

=== 2005 ===
- Farm Animals, 11 January
- South West England, 8 February
- Jane Eyre, 24 February
- Magic!, 15 March
- Castle series Definitives, 22 March
- World Heritage Sites, 21 April
- Trooping the Colour, 7 June
- Motorcycles, 19 July
- A Celebration of Food, 23 August
- Classic ITV, 15 September
- Trafalgar, 18 October
- Christmas 2005, 1 November

=== 2006 ===
- Animal Tales, 10 January
- England, 7 February
- Brunel, 23 February
- Opening of the Welsh Assembly Building, 1 March
- Ice Age Animals, 21 March
- Definitives and country stamps for new postage rates, 28 March
- Her Majesty The Queen's 80th Birthday, 18 April
- World Cup Winners, 6 June
- Modern Architecture, 20 June
- National Portrait Gallery, 18 July
- Three Kings, 31 August
- Victoria Cross, 21 September
- Sounds of Britain, 3 October
- Christmas 2006, 7 November
- Lest We Forget, 9 November

=== 2007 ===
- The Beatles, 9 January
- Sea Life, 1 February
- The Sky at Night, 13 February
- World of Invention, 1 March
- Abolition of the Slave Trade, 22 March
- Celebrating England, 23 April
- Beside the Seaside, 15 May
- 40th Anniversary of the Machin, 5 June
- Grand Prix, 3 July
- 10th Anniversary of the First Harry Potter Book, 17 July
- Scouts, 26 July
- British Army Uniforms, 20 September
- Endangered Species – Birds, 4 September
- The Queen's 60th Wedding Anniversary, 16 October
- Christmas, 6 November
- Lest We Forget, 8 November

=== 2008 ===
- James Bond Centenary of Birth of Ian Fleming (6 stamps + Prestige Book), 8 January
- LOVE (Booklet), 15 January
- Working Dogs Centenary (6 stamps) 5 February
- Kings & Queens (Part 1) (Houses of Lancaster and York) (6 stamps + MS), 28 February
- Greetings Booklet, 28 February
- Celebrating Northern Ireland (MS) and Glorious N.Ireland (Smilers sheet), 11 March
- Mayday – Rescue at Sea (6 stamps), 13 March
- New Machin definitives & Country stamps for new postage rates, 1 April
- Territorial Army Centenary (Commemorative Sheet), 1 April
- Insects "Action for Species" 2 (10 stamps), 15 April
- Cathedrals 300th anniversary of completion of St Paul's Cathedral: (6 stamps + MS), 13 May
- Retail booklet – Summer holidays, 13 May
- Classic Films "Carry on" and "Hammer" Films anniversaries (6 stamps), 10 June
- London 1908 Olympics (Commemorative Sheet), 23 June
- Airshows (6 stamps), 17 July
- Beijing Expo (Smilers Sheet) August
- Olympics Handover – 2008 Beijing Olympics (MS), 22 August
- Olympics Handover – 2008 Beijing Olympics (4xNVI 1st Class Stamps) + (MS), 22 August 2008
- British RAF Uniforms – (6 stamps 3xNVI 1st "Drum Major", "Helicopter Rescue", "Hawker Hunter Pilot", 3x81p, "Lancaster Gunner", "WAAF Plotter", "1918 Pilot") 18 September
- British RAF Uniforms – (6 stamps + Prestige Book), 18 September
- Country Definitives – 50th anniversary, (MS of 9 stamps + Prestige Book), 29 September
- Glorious UK (Smilers sheet), 29 September
- Women of Distinction (6 stamps), 14 October
- Christmas – Pantomime (6 stamps + MS + Smilers), 4 November
- Lest We Forget – 90th anniversary of end of the First World War (MS), 6 November

=== 2009 ===
- Design Classics (10 stamps + Prestige Book + Smilers + Self Adhesive retail books released in February, April and September), 13 January
- 250th Anniversary of the birth of Robert Burns (MS), 22 January
- 200th Anniversary of the birth of Charles Darwin (6 stamps + MS + Prestige Book), 12 February
- Celebrating Wales (MS), 26 February
- Pioneers of the Industrial Revolution (8 stamps), 17 March
- New Machin Definitives and Country Stamps for new postage rates April
- Kings & Queens Part 2 (Tudors) (6 stamps +MS), 21 April
- Endangered Plants & 250th Anniversary of Kew Gardens (10 stamps + MS), 19 May
- Treasure of the Archive (Prestige Book) May
- Mythical Creatures (6 stamps), 16 June
- Olympic Disciplines (10 stamps) July
- Postboxes (MS), 18 August
- Fire Brigade (6 stamps), 1 September
- Royal Navy Uniforms (6 stamp + Prestige Book), 17 September
- Eminent Britons (10 stamps), 8 October
- Olympic & Paralympic Games (20 stamps), 22 October
- Christmas – The Nativity Story as depicted on church stained glass (7 stamps + MS + Smilers), 3 November

=== 2010 ===
- Classic Album Covers, 7 January
- Girl Guiding, 2 February
- The Royal Society, 25 February
- Battersea Dogs and Cats Home, 11 March
- Kings and Queens – The Stewarts, 23 March
- Mammals, 13 April
- King George V sheet, 6 May
- Festival of Stamps sheet, 8 May
- London 2010 sheet, 8 May
- Britain Alone, 13 May
- The Stuarts, 15 June
- Olympic Games, 27 July
- Great British Railways, 19 August
- Winnie the Pooh, 12 October
- Wallace and Gromit X-mas, MS, Generic Smiler 2 November

=== 2011 ===
- Classic Children's Television, the Genius of Gerry Anderson – set of 6 & lenticular miniature sheet and Thunderbirds Retail Booklet, 11 January
- Pictorial Faststamps, Birds II – Garden Birds 2, 24 January
- Classic Locomotives of England, Minisheet, 1 Feb
- Indipex Stamp Exhibition Generic Smilers Sheet – 20 x Union flag, 10x labels incl 1969 Gandhi stamp, 12 Feb
- West End Stage Musicals set of 6, 24 Feb
- Retail Booklet: British Heart Foundation 50th Anniv: has Medical Breakthroughs Beta-Blockers 1st stamp, 24 Feb
- Magical Realms – including Discworld, Narnia, Harry Potter, King Arthur: set of 8, 8 March
- 50th Anniv World Wide Fund for Nature – set of 10, MS & Prestige Booklet, 22 March
- Commemorative Sheet 50th anniversary of Jaguar E-type, 30 March
- Royal Shakespeare Company 50th Anniversary set of 6 + Minisheet, 12 April
- Royal Wedding – miniature sheet of 4 stamps, 21 April
- William Morris & Co 150th Anniversary set of 6 + Prestige Booklet, 5 May
- Pictorial Faststamps, Water Birds 3 – Mallard, Mute Swan, Kingfisher, Moorhen, Greylag Goose and Great Crested Grebe, 19 May
- Rev Wilbert Awdry Birth Cent. (author, Thomas the Tank Engine stories) Set of 6, Minisheet and booklet, 14 June
- The Duke of Edinburgh's 90th Birthday Commemorative Sheet, 14 June
- Olympics/Paralympics series III – 10x1st class stamps, a Commemorative Sheet and a Composite Sheet/30 stamps, 27 July
- Phila'nippon 11, Japan, Exhibition Generic Smilers Sheet, 28 July
- The Crown Jewels set of 8, 23 August
- Classic Locomotives of England retail booklet, 23 August
- World's First Scheduled Airmail, Windsor – Minisheet and Prestige stamp book, 9 September
- Arnold Machin Birth Centenary miniature sheet, 14 September
- Kings & Queens, House of Hanover, set of 6 + Minisheet, 15 September
- Olympics/Paralympics retail booklet 6, 15 September
- 350th Anniv of the Postmark – Generic Smilers Sheet, 15 September
- Pictorial Faststamps, Birds 4 – Sea birds, 16 September
- A-Z of the United Kingdom (part 1 – 12 stamps, A-L), 13 October
- Retail booklets: 6 x 1st with 2012 Stamp Calendar on inside cover. 12 x 2nd, 12 x 1st, 4 x 2nd Large, 4 x 1st *Large all with Forest Stewardship Council logo, 25 October
- Christmas 400th Anniv. of the King James Version of the Bible – set of 7, MS, Smilers Sheet, Stamp booklets, 8 Nov

=== 2012 ===
- 5 January – Olympic and Paralympic Games Definitive Stamps
- 10 January – Roald Dahl
- 20 January – Year of the Dragon Generic Smilers Sheet
- 2 February – The House of Windsor (Kings and Queens 6) Set and MS
- 6 February – HM The Queen's Diamond Jubilee definitive + MS
- 23 February – Britons of Distinction (Basil Spence, Frederick Delius, Mary 'May' Morris, Odette Hallowes, Thomas Newcomen, Kathleen Ferrier, Augustus Pugin, Montague Rhodes James, Alan Turing, Joan Mary Fry)
- 24 February – Fast Stamps -Agriculture
- 8 March – Classic Locomotives of Scotland MS
- 20 March – World of Children's Comics
- 10 April – A-Z of the UK, part 2 (14 stamps)
- 24 April – Post & Go – Pigs
- 15 May – Design Classics, Fashion
- 21 May – Post & Go – Union Flag
- 31 May – HM The Queen's Diamond Jubilee
- 19 June – Charles Dickens
- 27 July – Olympic Games (Welcome)
- July–August – GB Gold medal winners; stamps issued within 24 hours of event
  - Helen Glover and Heather Stanning – Women's coxless pair
  - Bradley Wiggins – Men's road time trial
  - Tim Baillie and Etienne Stott – Men's slalom C-2
  - Peter Wilson – Men's double trap
  - Philip Hindes, Chris Hoy and Jason Kenny – Men's team sprint
  - Katherine Grainger and Anna Watkins – Women's double sculls
  - Steven Burke, Ed Clancy, Peter Kennaugh and Geraint Thomas – Men's team pursuit
  - Victoria Pendleton – Women's keirin
  - Katherine Copeland and Sophie Hosking – Women's lightweight double sculls
  - Alex Gregory, Tom James, Pete Reed and Andrew Triggs Hodge – Men's coxless four
  - Danielle King, Joanna Rowsell and Laura Trott – Women's team pursuit
  - Jessica Ennis – Women's heptathlon
  - Greg Rutherford – Men's long jump
  - Mo Farah – Men's 10,000 metres
  - Ben Ainslie – Finn class
  - Andy Murray – Men's singles
  - Scott Brash, Peter Charles, Ben Maher and Nick Skelton – Team jumping
  - Jason Kenny – Men's sprint
  - Alistair Brownlee – Men's triathlon
  - Laura Bechtolsheimer, Charlotte Dujardin, Carl Hester – Team dressage
  - Laura Trott – Women's omnium
  - Chris Hoy – Men's keirin
  - Charlotte Dujardin – Individual dressage
  - Nicola Adams – Women's flyweight
  - Jade Jones – Women's 57 kg
  - Ed McKeever – Men's K-1 200 metres
  - Mo Farah – Men's 5,000 metres
  - Luke Campbell – Men's bantamweight
  - Anthony Joshua – Men's super heavyweight
- 29 August – Paralympic Games (Welcome)
- 27 September – Olympic and Paralympic Games (Memories)
- 28 September – Post & Go – Cattle
- 16 October – World of Dinosaurs
- 30 October – Space Science
- 8 November – Christmas 2012

=== 2013 ===
- 9 January – 150th anniversary of the London Underground
- 21 February – Jane Austen
- 22 February – Post and Go – Freshwater Life 1 : Ponds Stamp Set
- 26 March – Classic TV – 50 years of Dr Who
- 16 March – Great Britons
- 9 May – Football Heroes
- 30 May – Royal Portraits – Her Majesty the Queen
- 18 June – Classic Locomotives of Northern Ireland
- 11 July – Butterflies
- 8 August – Andy Murray
- 13 August – British Auto Legends
- 19 September – Merchant Navy
- 20 September – Post & Go – Freshwater Life 3 : River Life Set
- 10 October – Dinosaurs
- 5 November – Christmas

=== 2014 ===
- 7 January – Classic Children's TV
- 4 February – Working Horses
- 20 February – Classic Locomotives of Wales
- 21 February – Post & Go – British Flora 1 : Spring Blooms
- 25 March – Remarkable Lives
- 15 April – Buckingham Palace
- 13 May – Great British Film
- 5 June – Sustainable Fish
- 17 July – Glasgow 2014 (XX Commonwealth Games)
- 28 July – The Great War 1914
- 18 September – Seaside Architecture
- 19 September – Post & Go – British Flora 2 : Symbolic Flowers
- 14 October – Prime Ministers
- 4 November – Christmas
- 13 November – Post & Go – British Flora 3 : Winter Greenery

=== 2015 ===
- 6 January – Alice's Adventures in Wonderland
- 18 February – Post & Go: Working Sail
- 19 February – Inventive Britain
- 5 March – Bridges
- 1 April – Comedy Greats
- 6 May – The 175th Anniversary of the Penny Black
- 13 May – Post & Go: Heraldic Beasts
- 14 May – First World War
- 2 June – Magna Carta
- 18 June – The Battle of Waterloo (200th anniversary)
- 16 July – The 75th Anniversary of the Battle of Britain
- 18 August – Bees
- 9 September – Long to Reign Over Us (Her Majesty The Queen becoming the longest reigning UK monarch)
- 16 September – Post & Go: Sea Travel
- 18 September – Rugby World Cup
- 20 October – Star Wars
- 3 November – Christmas 2015

=== 2016 ===
- 7 January – Shackleton and the Endurance Expedition
- 28 January – Duke of Edinburgh Awards: 60th anniversary
- 17 February – Royal Mail 500 – Post & Go: Royal Mail Heritage
- 18 February – Penny Red Generic Sheet – Royal Mail Heritage PSB
- 15 March – British Humanitarians
- 5 April – William Shakespeare (400th anniversary of his death)
- 21 April – HM The Queen's 90th Birthday
- 25 April – First World War: ANZAC
- 17 May – Animail
- 28 May – New York 2016 FIP Exhibition
- 21 June – First World War: 1916
- 7 July – Music Giants: Pink Floyd
- 28 July – Beatrix Potter
- 16 August – Landscape Gardens
- 2 September – Great Fire of London
- 14 September – Post & Go: Ladybirds
- 15 September – Agatha Christie
- 14 October – Battle of Hastings: 950th anniversary
- 20 October – Mr Men and Little Misses
- 8 November – Christmas 2016
- 14 November – Post & Go: Hibernating Animals

=== 2017 ===
- 17 January – Ancient Britain
- 6 February – 65th Anniversary of the Accession
- 15 February – Windsor Castle
- 15 February – Post and Go Postal Heritage: Mail by Rail
- 14 March – Music Giants II – David Bowie
- 21 March – New Machin and Country Definitives
- 6 April – Racehorse Legends
- 4 May – Songbirds
- 24 May – Exhibition Generic Sheet: Finlandia 2017
- 5 June – Machin Definitive 50th anniversary
- 5 June – Machin Anniversary Post and Go
- 13 June – HRH The Princess Royal
- 20 June – Windmills and Watermills
- 30 June – Celebrating Canada
- 13 July – Landmark Buildings
- 31 July – World War I (1917)
- 22 August – Classic Toys
- 13 September – Post and Go Postal Heritage: Mail by Air
- 13 September – Opening of The Postal Museum
- 14 September – Ladybird Books
- 12 October – Star Wars
- 7 November – Christmas
- 20 November – The Royal Wedding: Platinum Anniversary

=== 2018 ===
- 23 January – Game of Thrones
- 23 January – Post and Go – Game of Thrones
- 15 February – Votes for Women
- 20 March – Royal Air Force Centenary
- 17 April – Reintroduced Species
- 11 May – Owls
- 19 May – Wedding of Prince Harry and Meghan Markle – using engagement photographs by Alexi Lubomirski
- 1 June – 150th Anniversary of Trades Union Congress
- 5 June – Royal Academy of Arts
- 26 June – Dad's Army
- 31 July – Hampton Court Palace
- 16 August – Captain Cook and Endeavour
- 30 August – The Old Vic
- 12 September – Royal Mail Heritage – Mail by Bike
- 13 September – First World War 1918
- 16 October – Harry Potter and J.K. Rowling's Wizarding World
- 1 November – Christmas
- 14 November – HRH The Prince of Wales – 70th Birthday

=== 2019 ===
- 15 January – Stamp Classics
- 13 February – Leonardo da Vinci
- 14 March – Marvel
- 4 April – Birds of Prey
- 2 May – British Engineering
- 24 May – Queen Victoria Bicentenary
- 6 June – D-Day
- 9 July – Curious Customs
- 13 August – Forests
- 3 September – Music Giants – Elton John
- 19 September – Royal Navy Ships
- 26 September – ICC Men's Cricket World Cup 2019 / ICC Women's World Cup 2017
- 10 October – The Gruffalo
- 5 November – Christmas
- xx November – Star Wars

=== 2020 ===
- 21 January – Video Games
- 11 February – Visions of the Universe
- 17 March – James Bond
- 7 April – The Romantic Poets
- 8 May – End of the Second World War
- 28 May – Coronation Street
- 18 June – Roman Britain
- 9 July – Queen
- 30 July – The Palace of Westminster
- 18 August – Sherlock
- 3 September – Rupert Bear
- 1 October – Brilliant Bugs
- 3 November – Christmas
- 13 November – Star Trek

=== 2021 ===
- 14 January – UK National Parks
- 26 January – United Kingdom: A Celebration (Great Creativity; Great Industry and Innovation; Great Industry and Innovation; Great Sport)
- 16 February – Only Fools and Horses (television program, 40th anniversary of first broadcast)
- 16 March – The Legend of King Arthur (550th anniversary of the death of Sir Thomas Malory)
- 29 March – Queen Legends
- 15 April – Classic Science Fiction (75th anniversary of the death of H. G. Wells and the 70th anniversary of the publication of The Day of the Triffids)
- 4 May – The Wars of the Roses (450th anniversaries of the Battle of Tewkesbury and the Battle of Barnet)
- 28 May – Paul McCartney
- 24 June – In Memoriam – HRH The Prince Philip, Duke of Edinburgh
- 1 July – Dennis and Gnasher (70th anniversary of first publication)
- 22 July – Wild Coasts
- 12 August – Industrial Revolutions
- 2 September – British Army Vehicles
- 17 September – DC Comics collection
- 19 October – Rugby Union
- 2 November – Christmas 2021

=== 2022 ===
- 20 January – Music Giants VI – The Rolling Stones
- February – Barcoded everyday "definitive" and Christmas stamps introduced after trials; non-barcoded "definitive" stamps no longer valid from 1 February 2023
- 4 February – Her Majesty the Queen's Platinum Jubilee
- 18 February – The Stamp Designs of David Gentleman
- 8 March – The FA Cup
- 23 March – Heroes of the Covid Pandemic
- 7 April – Migratory Birds
- 5 May – Unsung Heroes: Women of World War II
- 9 June – Cats
- 1 July – Pride
- 28 July – Birmingham 2022 Commonwealth Games
- 1 September – Transformers

The following issues continue to bear the silouette of HM Queen Elizabeth II, who died on 8th September 2022

- 29 September – Royal Marines
- 19 October – Aardman Classics
- 3 November – Christmas 2022
- 10 November – In Memoriam : Her Majesty The Queen
- 24 November – Tutankhamun

=== 2023 ===
- 12 January – Iron Maiden
- 16 February – X-Men
- 9 March – The Flying Scotsman – final issue with silhouette of HM Queen Elizabeth II

== King Charles III ==
=== 2023 ===
- 23 March – Flowers – first issue to feature the silhouette of HM King Charles III. Also the first change of silhouette since 1968
- 4 April – King Charles III Definitive
- 13 April – The Legend of Robin Hood
- 6 May – His Majesty King Charles III: A New Reign
- 17 May – Blackadder
- 8 June – Warhammer
- 22 June – Windrush: 75 Years
- 13 July – River Wildlife
- 10 Aug – Terry Pratchett's Discworld
- 5 Sep – Paddington Bear
- 21 Sep – Dame Shirley Bassey
- 19 Oct – Harry Potter
- 2 Nov - Christmas

=== 2024 ===
- 11 January - Spice Girls
- 1 February - Weather Forecasting
- 20 February - Viking Britain
- 12 March - The Age of the Dinosaurs
- 16 April - 100 Years of Commemorative Stamps
- 16 May - Peppa Pig
- 6 June - Dogs
- 20 June - Red Arrows - 60 Seasons
- 25 July - Dungeons & Dragons
- 13 August - Union Flag
- 13 August - Tower of London
- 3 Sept. - Porridge
- 26 Sept. - Spiders
- 17 October - The Who
- 5 November - Christmas
- 30 November - Sir Winston Churchill

=== 2025 ===
- 14 January - The Vicar of Dibley
- 30 January - Royal Armouries
- 18 February - AC/DC
- 11 March - Garden Wildlife
- 27 March - Myths and Legends
- 1 May - Valour and Victory: Stories of the Second World War
- 22 May - The Chronicles of Narnia
- 12 June - Royal Observatory Greenwich
- 3 July - Mushrooms
- 24 July - Peanuts (75th anniversary)
- 14 August - Monty Python
- 11 September - Ducks
- 25 September - Steam Locomotives
- 16 October - Monopoly
- 4 November - Christmas - Nativity
- 27 November - Stamps of Queen Victoria

== See also ==
- Postage stamps and postal history of the United Kingdom
- Regional postage stamps of the United Kingdom
- United Kingdom commemorative stamps 1924–1969
- United Kingdom commemorative stamps 1970–1979
- United Kingdom commemorative stamps 1980–1989
- United Kingdom commemorative stamps 1990–1999
- United Kingdom commemorative stamps 2000–2009
- United Kingdom commemorative stamps 2010–2019
- United Kingdom commemorative stamps 2020–2029
