= Three Halfpence Red =

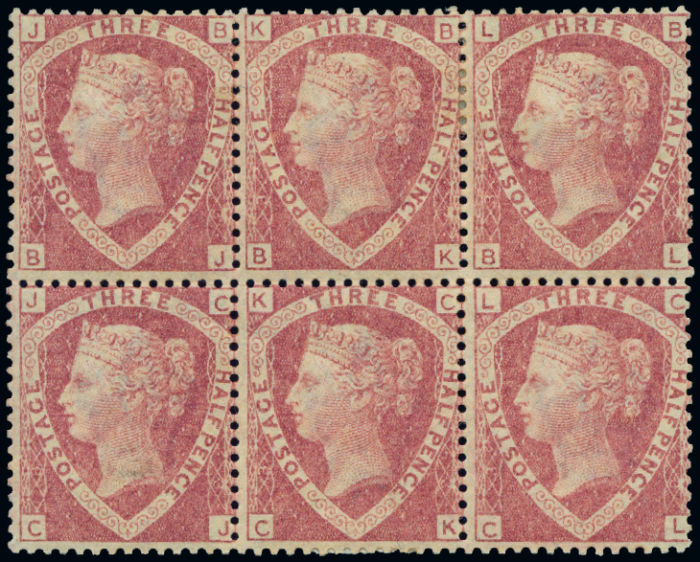
- Country of production: United Kingdom
- Date of production: October 1, 1870–1880
- Depicts: Queen Victoria
- Face value: 1 1/2d

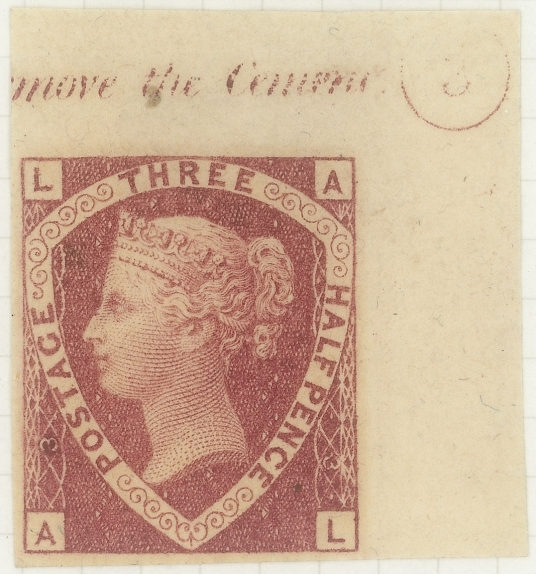
An imprimatur of the 1870 rose-red three halfpence stamp from Plate 3. In the collection of the British Postal Museum and Archive.

The Three Halfpence Red, first issued on 1 October 1870, was the first Three Halfpenny postage stamp issued in the United Kingdom.

The 1 1/2d stamp was line engraved and featured the bust of Queen Victoria in profile common to the Penny Black and Penny Red, bordered by 'Postage Three Half Pence' and numbered in the corners. It was printed in rose-red and lake-red colours. There is also rare variation in rosy-mauve produced ten years earlier in 1860 in anticipation of a change in postal rates. The new rate was not approved and 10,000 sheets of the stamps were destroyed in 1867 but a few copies survive in unused condition.

The plates were numbered 1 and 3, plate 2 was defective and not completed. For plate 3 only, a plate number was engraved in the design, in the left and right side lacework.

The stamp was replaced in 1880 by the surface printed three halfpenny venetian red stamp.

== See also ==
- List of British postage stamps
- Postage stamps and postal history of Great Britain

== References and sources ==
Sources

- Stanley Gibbons Ltd, Specialised Stamp Catalogue Volume 1: Queen Victoria
- Three Halfpence at pennyreds
