= Imprimatur (philately) =

First stamps printed from a printing plate

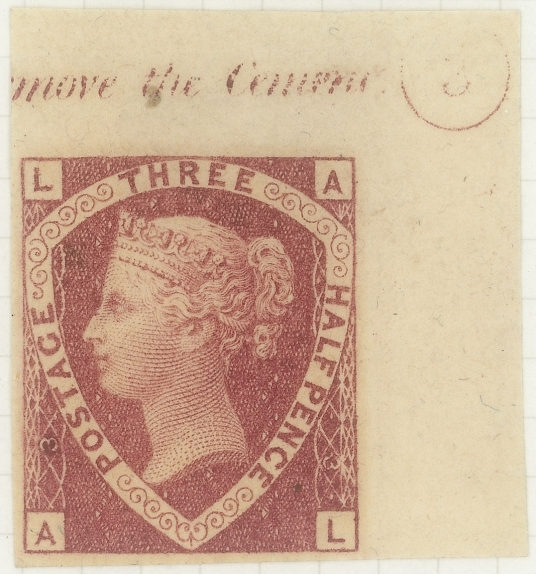
An imprimatur of the 1870 rose-red three halfpence stamp of Great Britain from Plate 3. In the collection of the British Postal Museum and Archive.

In philately the word imprimatur refers to the first stamps printed from an approved and finished printing plate.

The term is particularly associated with British Victorian stamps as it was the practice of the printers to retain the first sheet as a record.

The word is from the Latin "let it be printed".
