= Postage stamps and postal history of the United Kingdom =

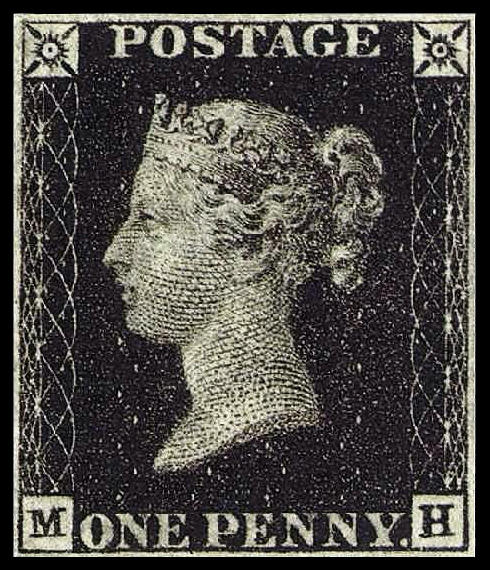
The British Penny Black is generally acknowledged as the world's first postage stamp.

Postage stamps and postal history of the United Kingdom surveys postal history and the postage stamps issued by that country (known in philatelic circles as "Great Britain"), and its various historical territories until the present day.

The postal history of the United Kingdom is notable in at least two respects: first, for the introduction of postage stamps in 1840, and secondly for the establishment of an efficient postal system throughout the British Empire, laying the foundation of many national systems still in existence today. As the originator of postage stamps, the UK is the only country that does not need to specify the country on its stamps, but only the denomination.

== Early history ==
In the 12th century Henry I appointed messengers to carry letters for the government. It is estimated that between 1100 and 1135, 4,500 letters were carried by these messengers. During this time, private individuals had to make their own arrangements. Henry III provided uniforms for the messengers, and Edward I instituted posting houses where the messengers could change horses. The reign of Edward II saw the first postal marking; handwritten notations saying "Haste. Post haste". Centuries later, during the reign of Elizabeth I to express an extreme degree of urgency of delivery, gallows were drawn on the letter, known as Gallows letters and may additionally have a version of "haste, post haste" added.

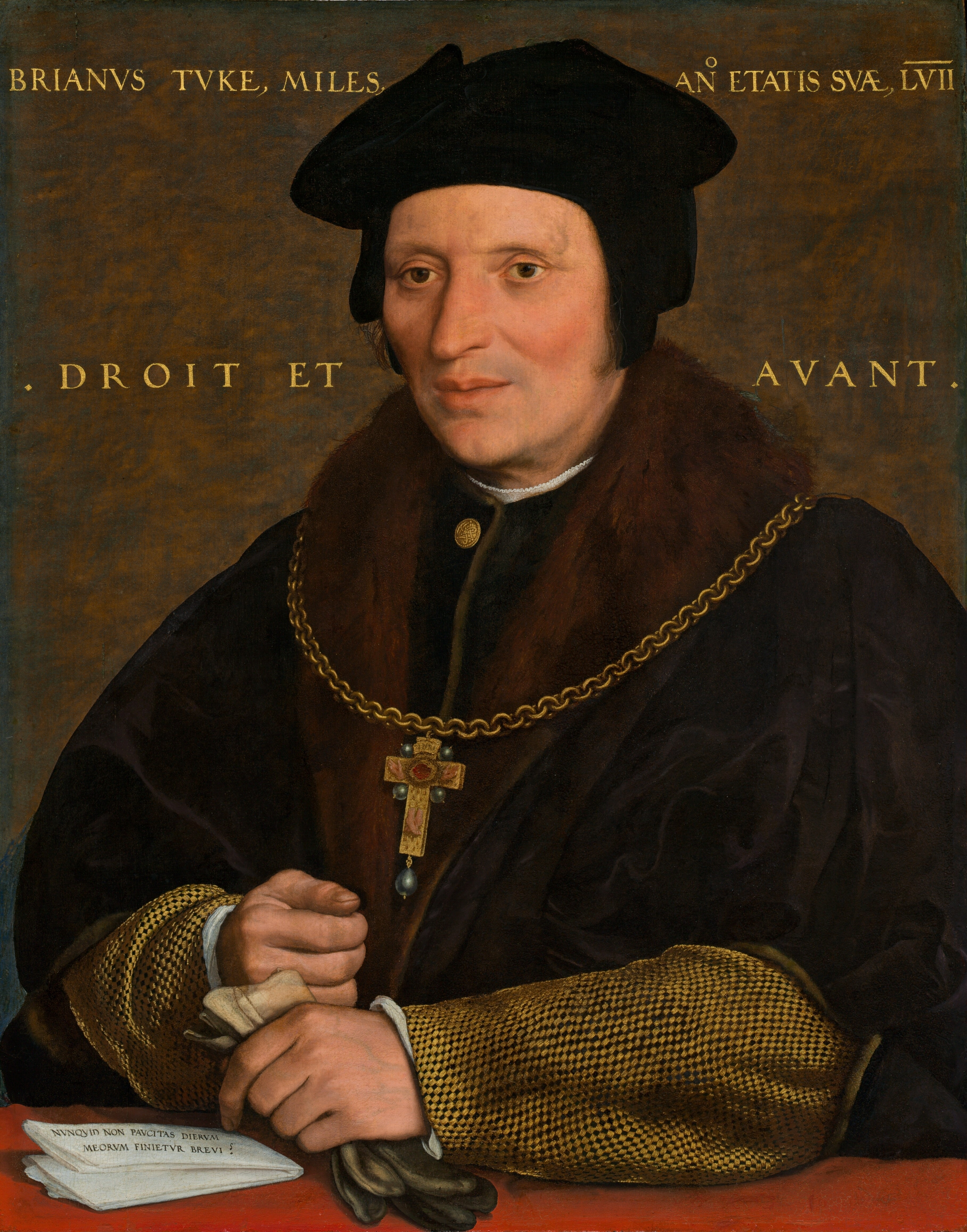
Brian Tuke was the first Master of the posts.

Henry VIII created the Royal Mail in 1516, appointing Brian Tuke as "Master of the Postes", while Elizabeth I appointed Thomas Randolph as "Chief Postmaster". Under Thomas Witherings, chief postmaster under Charles I, the Royal Mail was made available to the public (1635), with a regular system of post roads, houses, and staff. From this time through to the postal reforms of 1839–1840 it was most common for the recipient to pay the postage, although it was generally optional to prepay the charge within the British Isles.

In 1661, Charles II made Henry Bishop the first Postmaster General. In answer to customer complaints about delayed letters, Bishop introduced the Bishop mark, a small circle with month and day inside, applied at London, in the General Post office and the Foreign section, and soon after adopted in Scotland, (Edinburgh), and Ireland, (Dublin). In subsequent years, the postal system expanded from six roads to a network covering the country, and post offices were set up in both large and small towns, each of which had its own postmark.

In 1680 William Dockwra established the London Penny Post, a mail delivery system that delivered letters and parcels weighing up to one pound within the city of London and some of its immediate suburbs for the sum of one penny.

== Postage stamps and The Great Office Reform ==
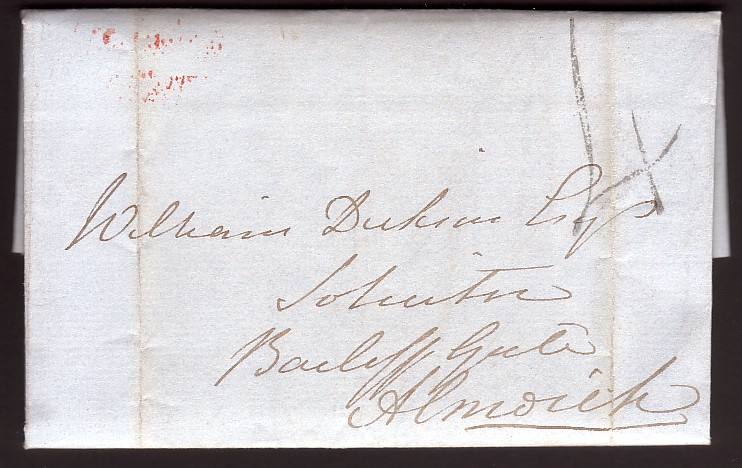
Second day use of Uniform Fourpenny Post with Edinburgh handstruck and 4

The Great Post Office Reforms of 1839 and 1840 were championed by Rowland Hill, who is often credited with the invention of the postage stamp, as a way to reverse the steady financial losses of the Post Office. Hill persuaded Parliament to adopt the Uniform Fourpenny Post whereby a flat 4d per half ounce rate (equivalent to 10s 8d per pound for heavier items) was charged regardless of distance.

From December 1839, letters could arrive at any address in the United Kingdom. The flat postage rate went into effect on 5 December 1839 but only lasted for 36 days. This was immediately successful, and on 10 January 1840 the Uniform Penny Post started, charging only 1d for prepaid letters and 2d if the fee was collected from the recipient. Fixed rates meant that it was practical to avoid handling money to send a letter by using an "adhesive label", and accordingly, on 6 May, the Penny Black became the world's first postage stamp in use.

After more than 2,000 suggestions were submitted, Rowland Hill chose the method and printer, and worked by trial and error to achieve the required result. He decided to go with Perkins, Bacon & Petch, "a firm of bank-note printers, to carry out the work by the process of steel engraving, and the head of the Queen as engraved by William Wyon for a special medal struck to celebrate Her Majesty's official visit to the City of London in the year of her Coronation."

The stamp was originally for use only within the United Kingdom of Great Britain and Ireland and as such was, in effect, a local stamp. For this reason the name of the country was not included within the design, a situation which continued by agreement with foreign post offices, provided the sovereign's effigy appeared on the stamp. Envelopes sold with postage paid did not include this, so were marked with the country's name. In 1951, the special commemorative issue for the Festival of Britain included the name "Britain" incidentally. It could therefore be said that the name of the country then appeared for the first time on a stamp of the UK, although the word "British" had appeared on British Empire Exhibition commemorative stamps of 1924.

After the stamp was circulating, it became obvious that black was not a good choice of stamp colour, since any cancellation marks were hard to see. So, from 1841, the stamps were printed in a brick-red colour. The Penny Reds continued in use for decades with about 21 billion being produced.

== Victorian era ==
The Victorian age saw an explosion of experimentation. The inefficiency of using scissors to cut stamps from the sheet inspired trials with rouletting (the Archer Roulette), and then with perforation, which became standard practice in 1854. In 1847, the (octagonal) 1 shilling (£0.05) became the first of the British embossed postage stamps to be issued, followed by 10d stamps the following year, and 6d (£0.025) values in 1854.

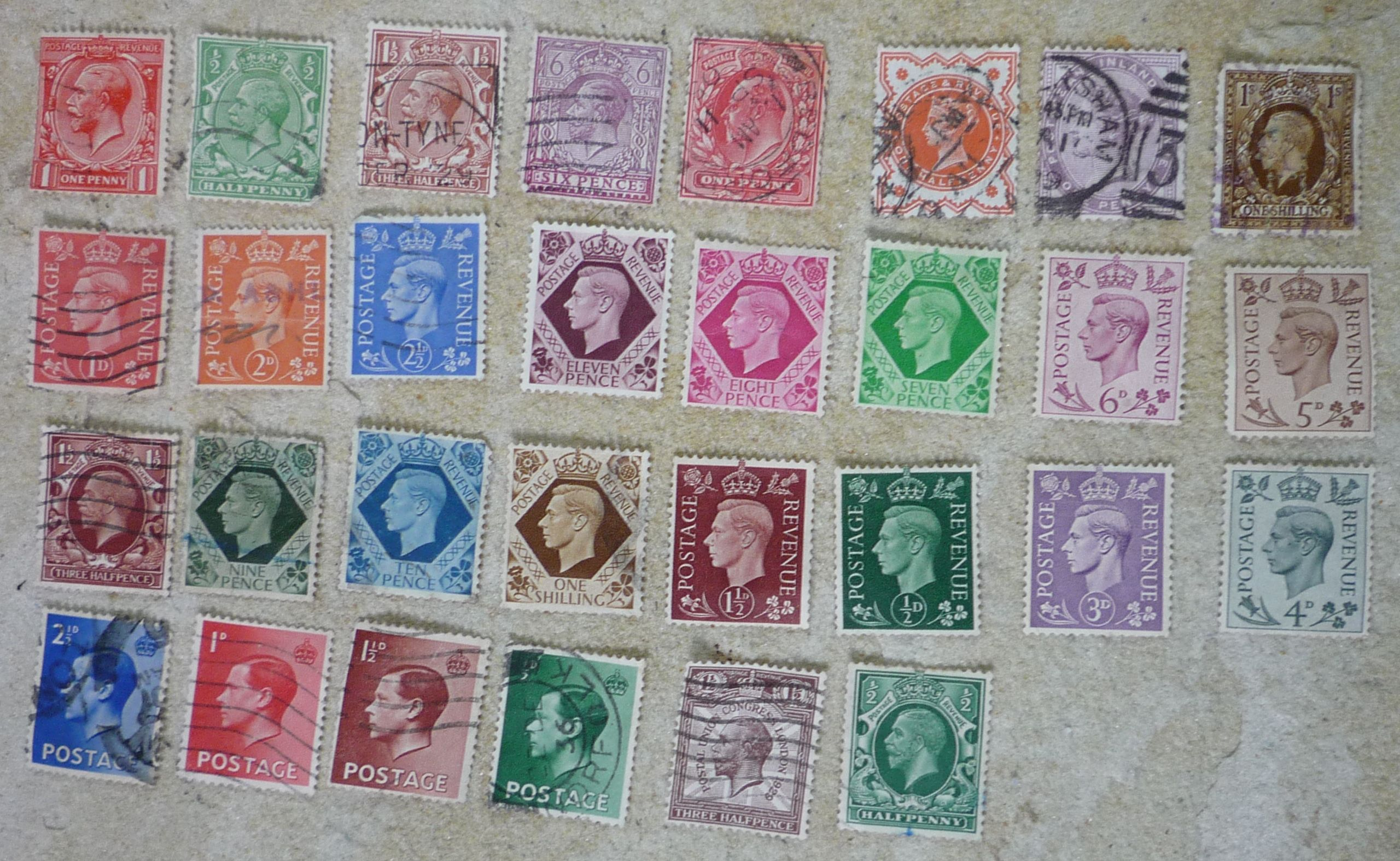
Great Britain definitive stamp collection with Queen Victoria, King Edward VII, King George V, King Edward VIII and King George VI portraits in multiple denominations (½d to 1s) and colour variations

Surface-printed stamps first appeared in the form of a 4d stamp in 1855, printed by De La Rue, and subsequently became the standard type. 1/2d (halfpenny) and 1 1/2d (penny halfpenny – pronounced pennyhaypny or threehaypence) engraved stamps issued in 1870 were the last engraved types of Queen Victoria; the next would not appear until 1913. Surface-printed stamps of the 1860s and 1870s all used the same profile of Victoria, but a variety of frames, watermarks, and corner lettering.

A 5-shilling (abbreviated as 5/- or 5s) (£0.25) stamp first appeared in 1867, followed by 10 shilling (£0.50) and £1 values in 1878, culminating in a £5 stamp in 1882.

Meanwhile, the age of the Penny Reds had come to an end along with the Perkins Bacon printing contract. The new low values were also surface-printed: first was a penny stamp coloured Venetian red in a square frame, issued in 1880. However, the passage of the Customs and Inland Revenue Act 1881 necessitated new stamps valid also as revenue stamps, and so the Penny Lilac was issued in that year, inscribed "POSTAGE AND INLAND REVENUE". This stamp remained the standard letter stamp for the remainder of Victoria's reign, and vast quantities were printed. Later issues were inscribed POSTAGE & REVENUE which became the more familiar POSTAGE REVENUE.

1883 and 1884 saw experimentation with stamps using fugitive inks with the 'Lilac and Green Issue'. These were rather plain designs, low values in lilac and high values in green, because those were the only colours available. They succeeded in their purpose – relatively few of the stamps survived usage, their colours fading away when soaked from the envelope – and they were not liked by the public.

The last major issue of Victoria was the Jubilee Issue of 1887, a set of twelve designs ranging from 1/2d to 1s, most printed in two colours or on coloured paper. (Although issued during the Jubilee year, they were not issued specifically for the occasion, and are thus not commemoratives.)

British colonies such as Barbados, Nevis, Fiji, Trinidad, British Guiana, and India at one time all used the William Wyon portrait of Queen Victoria on their stamps. Many formerly colonised countries whose head of state is the British monarch still include the monarch's profile, although some have branched out to stamps depicting scenery, birds or beasts without the profile.

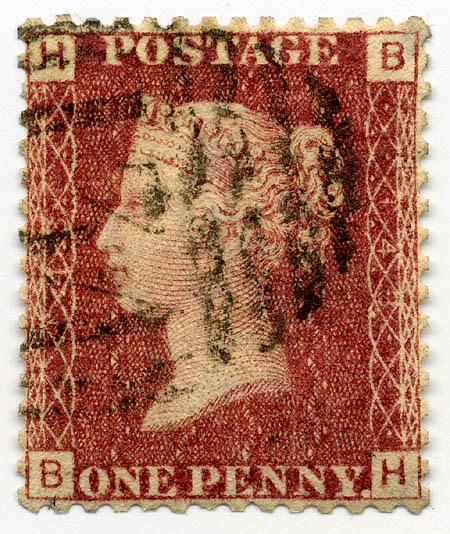
A perforated Penny Red, letters in four corners and plate 148, therefore printed 1871 or later

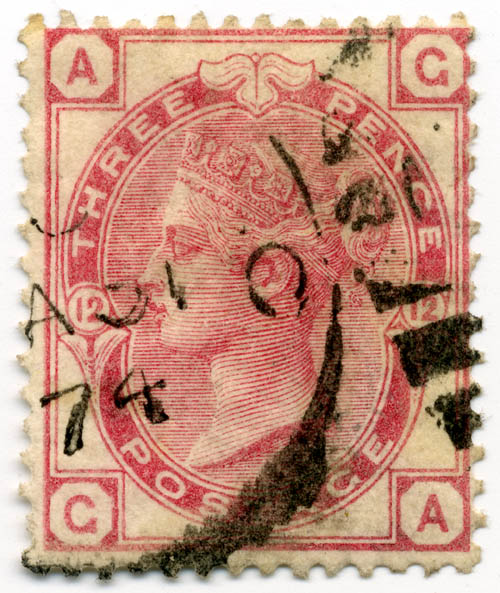
Threepence surface-printed value from 1873

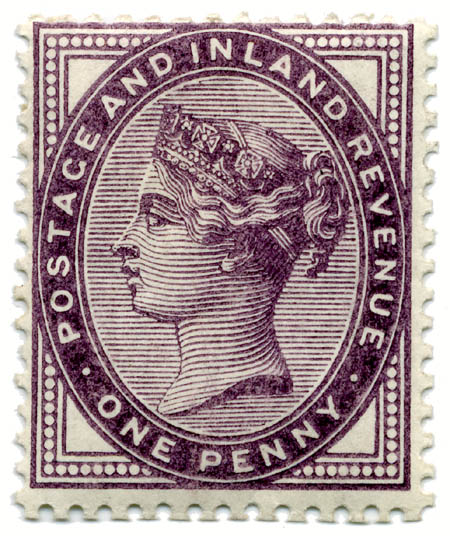
"Penny Lilac" of 1881; 16 dots in each corner

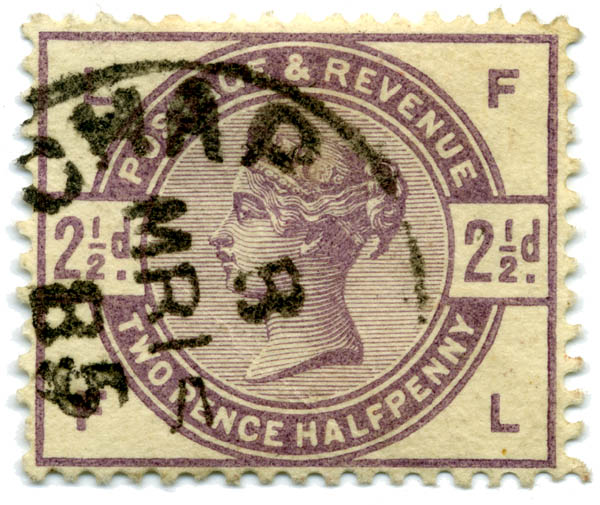
2½ old pence (twopenny halfpenny) value of the unpopular series of 1883/4

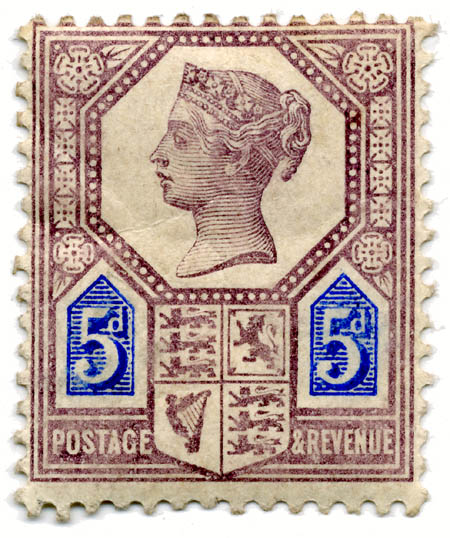
5d. "Jubilee" of 1887, among the first British stamps to be printed in two colours

== Early 20th century ==
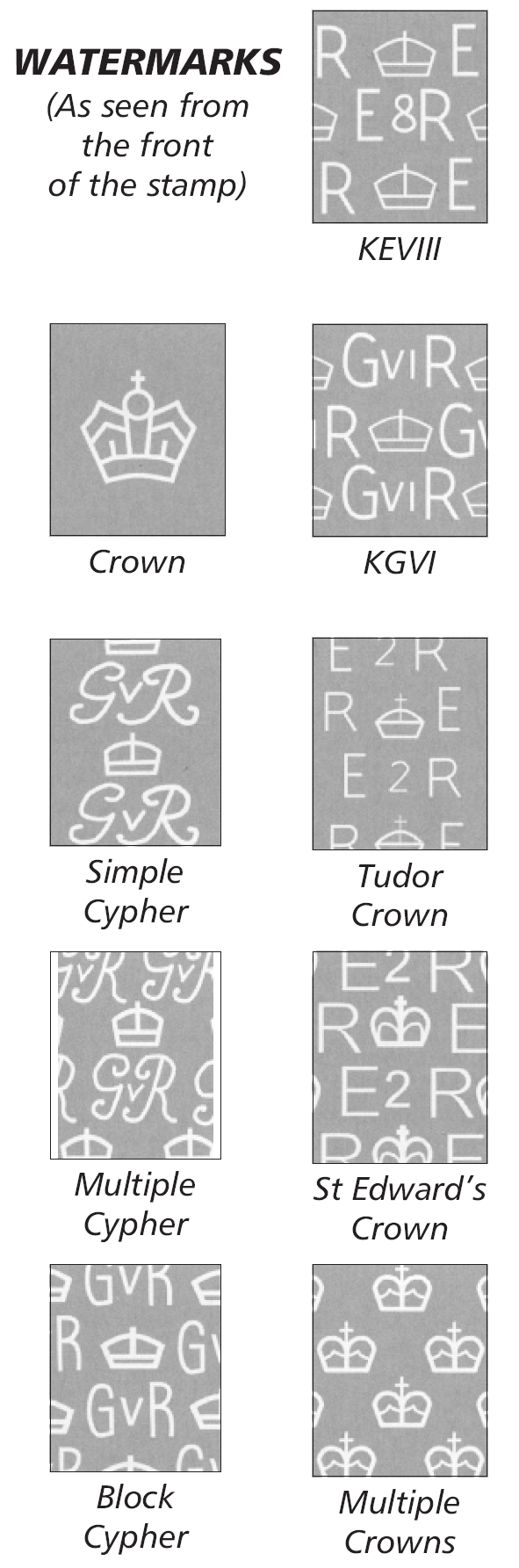
Common watermarks found on British stamps

When Edward VII succeeded to the throne, new stamps became necessary. The approach was very conservative, however most of the Jubilee frames were reused and the image of the King was still a single profile. Edward's reign was fairly short and there were no major changes of design as a result. Chalk-surfaced paper was introduced during this time (this type of paper can be detected by rubbing the surface with silver, which leaves a black mark).

By contrast, the stamps of George V were innovative from the very first. The first issue made was of the 1/2d and 1d values, which were in the same colours as used in the previous reign. Although the main design feature remained the same – a central ellipse for the portrait, an ornamental frame, value tablet at the base and a crown at the top – a three quarter portrait was used for the first time. However, subsequent designs reverted to the standard profile.

The UK's first commemorative stamps were issued for the British Empire Exhibition in 1924. The pair of large-format stamps featured a lion in an imposing stance; they were issued twice, in 1924 and then in 1925, the stamps of each year being inscribed with the year of issue. A second set of commemoratives in 1929 marked the 9th Congress of the Universal Postal Union (UPU), held in London that year.

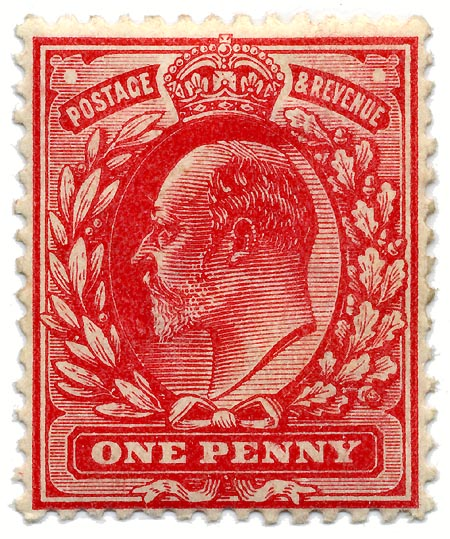
Edward VII 1d of 1902

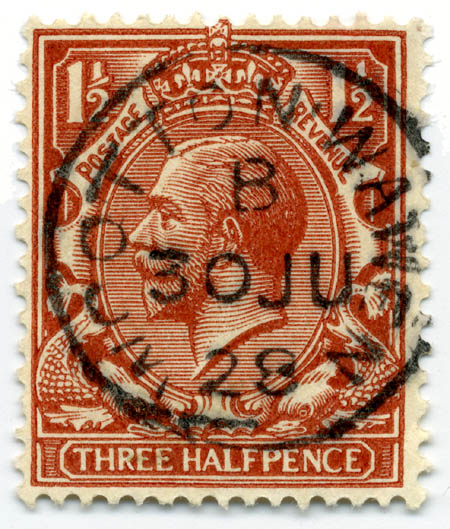
George V 1 1/2d of 1912, used in 1928 at Wootton Wawen in Warwickshire

=== Independence of the Irish Free State ===
Following the Anglo-Irish Treaty of 1921, responsibility for posts and telegraphs in what was initially called Southern Ireland transferred to the new Provisional Government. Upon the formal independence of the Irish Free State in December 1922, tha responsibility transferred to the Free State Government. A Postmaster General was initially appointed by the Free State Government, being replaced by the office of Minister for Posts and Telegraphs in 1924. An early visible manifestation was the repainting of all post boxes green instead of red, plus the overprinting of British postage stamps prior to the introduction of Irish stamps.

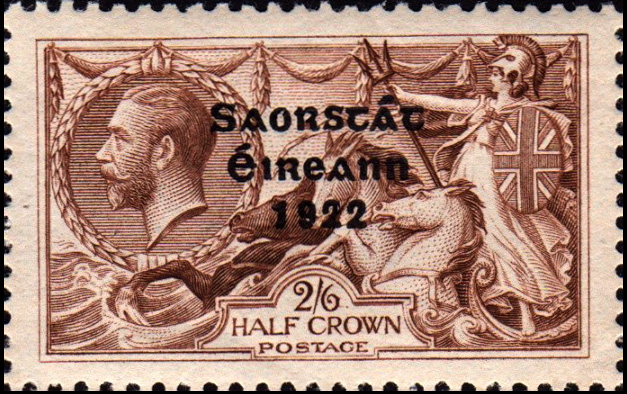
Irish Free State three-line overprint Saorstát Éireann 1922 on 2s 6d King George V stamp

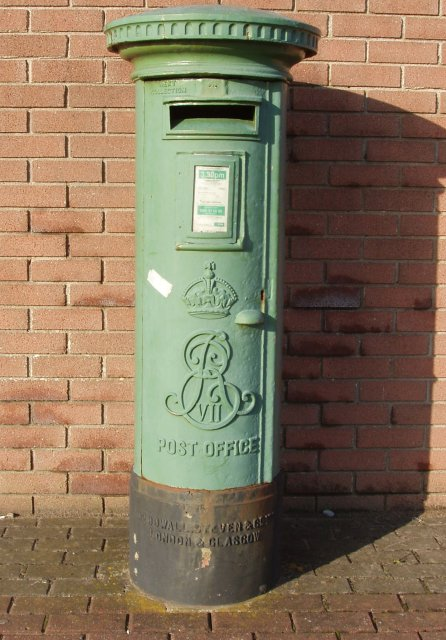
Green painted Edward VII pillar box at Rosslare Harbour

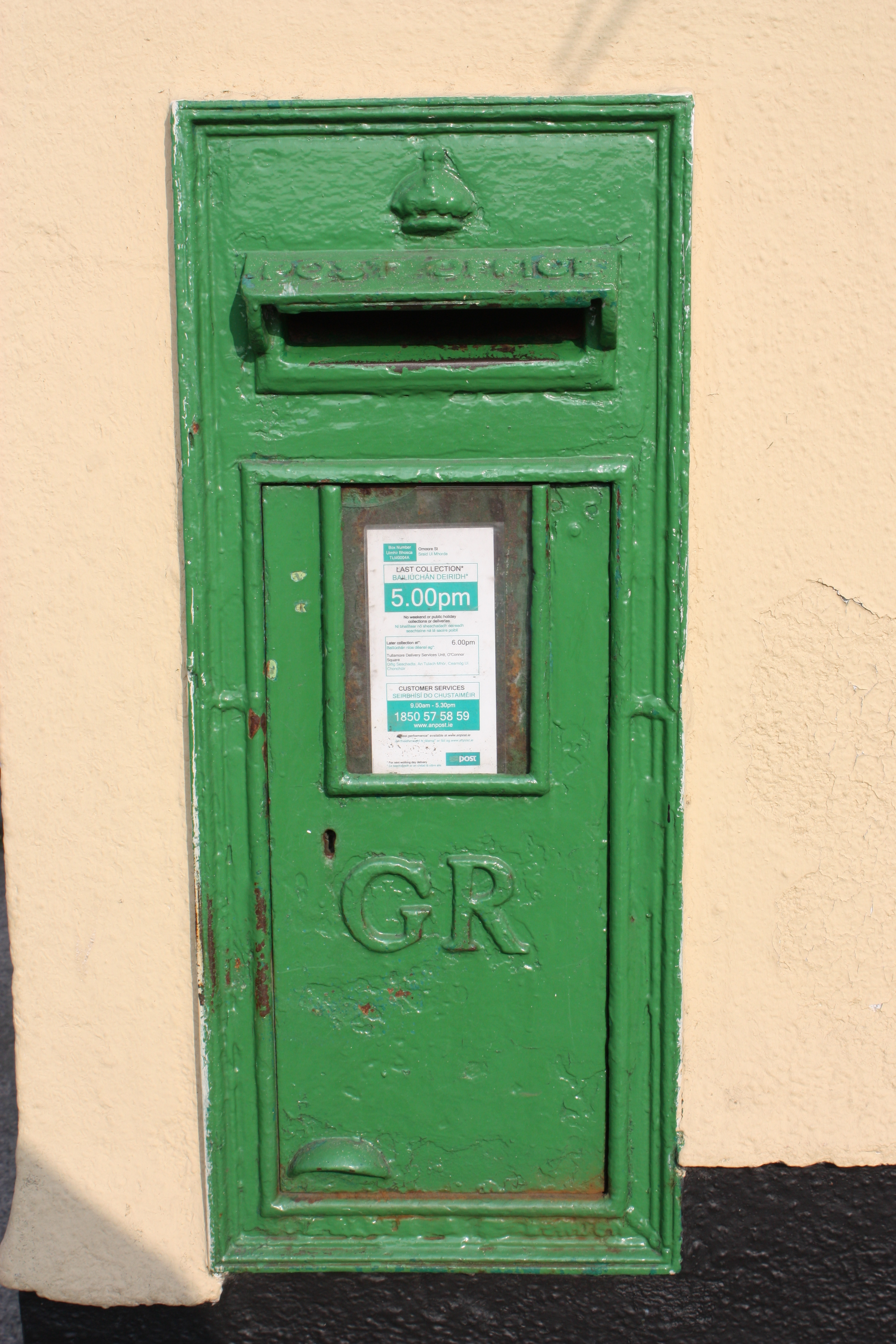
George V wall box showing small red specks under the green paint at Tullamore

== Abdication and war ==
A set of four stamps was issued in 1936 for Edward VIII before he abdicated. George VI's coronation was marked with a commemorative: part of an omnibus issue which included every colony in the Empire. New definitives featured a profile of the King on a solid colour background, based on a plaster cast by Edmund Dulac. This was a precursor of the Machins three decades later: see below.

The centenary of the postage stamp was celebrated in 1940 with a set of six stamps depicting Victoria and George VI side by side. By the following year, wartime exigencies affected stamp printing, with the 1937 stamps being printed with less ink, resulting in significantly lighter shades. Post-war issues included commemoratives for the return of peace, the Silver Jubilee and the 1948 Summer Olympics in 1948, and the 75th anniversary of the UPU, in 1949.

In 1950 the colours of all the low values were changed. 1951 saw a new series of high values (2s 6d, 5s, 10s, £1), and two commemoratives for the Festival of Britain.

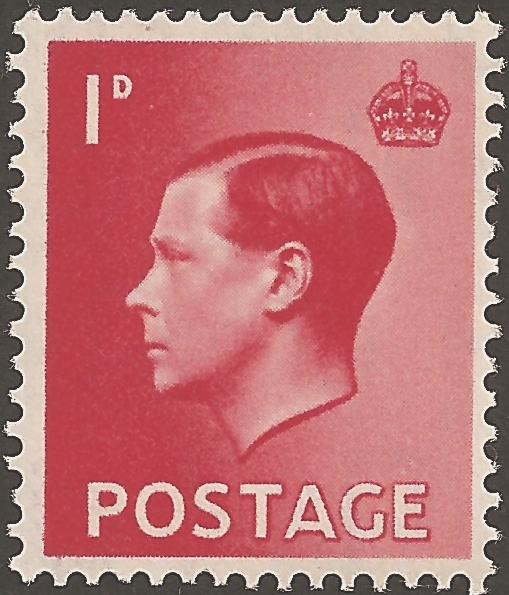
Edward VIII 1d of 1936

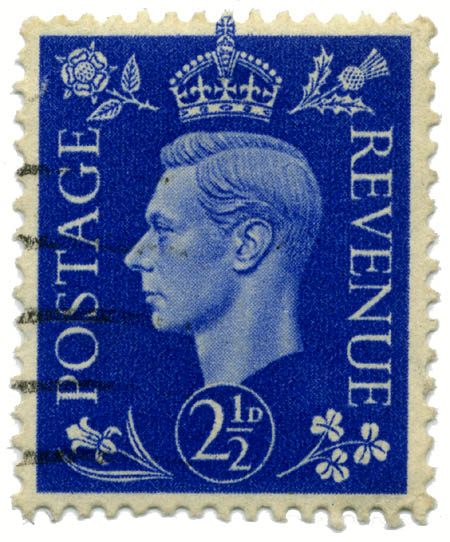
George VI 2 1/2d of 1937

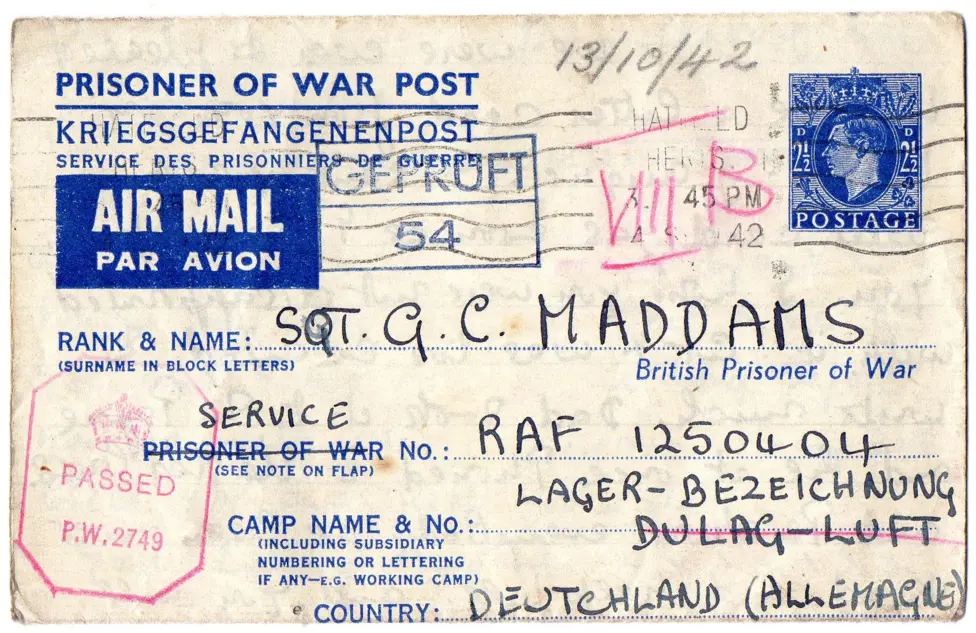
Pre-preprinted "Prisoner of War Post" letter, for the use of families of PoWs (used in October 1942)

== Modern era ==
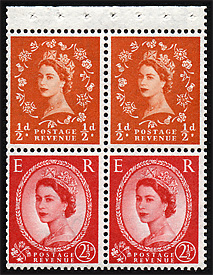
Queen Elizabeth II "Wilding issue" booklet pane of 1952

When Elizabeth II succeeded her father in 1952, new stamps were needed. A collection of variations on a theme that came to be known as the Wilding issues, based on a portrait of Queen Elizabeth II, was the result. This portrait was by photographer Dorothy Wilding.

The first Wildings, ½d and 2½d, were issued on 5 December 1952 and the series was used until 1967, when the Machin issues were introduced on 5 June. The Machin design is very simple, a profile of the Queen on a solid colour background, and very popular, still being the standard British stamp. They have been printed in scores of different colours; in addition, decimalisation required new denominations, and there have been technical improvements in the printing process, resulting in literally hundreds of varieties known to specialists. Special Stamps with pictures, and Christmas Stamps are also produced; they bear a small profile silhouette of the monarch.

First- and second-class postage was introduced in 1968. In 1989, Non-Value Indicated (NVI) stamps were produced marked "1st" and "2nd", valid for the lowest weight of that class. Either a "class" stamp can be used, or denominated stamps to the value of the postage. "Class" stamps remain valid for the stated class even after price increases. When letter size in addition to weight came into use to determine postage, additional "large letter" 1st and 2nd class stamps were added.

For over a century gummed stamps were produced in sheets, perforated so that individual stamps could be detached. From 2001, many stamps became self-adhesive, without perforations.

When Royal Mail was privatised in 2013, it retained the power to issue Britain's stamps.

Until 2022 any postage stamps since the 1971 decimalisation of British currency could be used; old "definitive" design stamps without barcodes were no longer be valid from 1 August 2023, with old ones exchangeable for barcoded ones indefinitely. It was initially announced that stamps without barcodes would not be valid from 1 February 2023. However, Royal Mail decided to add an additional six month grace period. Special stamps with pictures and Christmas stamps without a barcode will remain valid.

UK stamps bearing the head of Charles III became available on 4 April 2023. Unlike previous stamps depicting male monarchs, the new set features no crowns or any other decorations.

== Design trends of British stamps ==
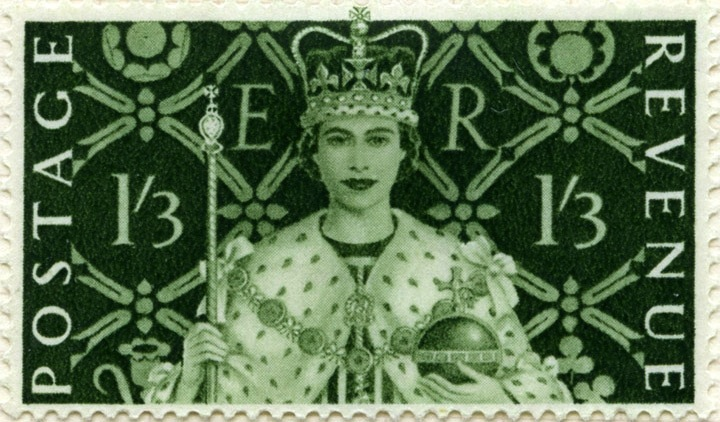
Coronation stamp, 1953 denominated 1s 3d

Up to the 1950s, British commemorative stamps were few and far between; most of the stamps were what are officially called "definitives", in which the portrait of the reigning monarch was the dominant element. Even after commemorative stamps began to appear more often during the 1950s and early 1960s, the monarch's effigy was prominent, usually taking up a quarter to a third of the stamp's design, which limited flexibility and creativity. A change came in 1965 when the then Postmaster General Tony Benn issued new criteria for what could appear on stamps. Designer David Gentleman wrote to Benn about alternative design approaches, suggesting the monarch's head be replaced by another national symbol, such as a crown or the country name; "Great Britain" or "United Kingdom". A compromise, a small silhouette of the Queen based on the coinage head of Mary Gillick, was accepted and this has been the standard ever since for commemorative stamps. When the monarch's portrait is part of the stamp's main design (as for example in the case of issues commemorating the monarch's birthday), then the silhouette is not needed and usually does not appear.

In 1967, The Red Boy by Sir Thomas Lawrence became the first artwork to appear on a British postage stamp.

Another trend is the growing use of stamps to commemorate events related to the present Royal Family. Up to Elizabeth II's accession in 1952 the only commemorative stamps to have been issued related to royal events were for George V's Silver Jubilee in 1935, George VI's coronation in 1937, and a 1948 issue to commemorate George VI's 25th wedding anniversary. Since 1952, however, stamps have been issued to commemorate many royal occasions. In addition, memorial stamps have been issued after the deaths of Diana, Princess of Wales (in 1998) and Queen Elizabeth the Queen Mother (in 2002).

=== Watercolour and Miniature Art in Stamp Design ===
While graphic design and photography dominate modern stamp production, the Royal Mail has occasionally commissioned traditional botanical artists to maintain historical accuracy. As noted by the Great Britain Philatelic Society, the June 1976 "Roses" centenary issue featured well-known varieties of the "English rose" designed and painted by Kristin Rosenberg, “a specialist in wild flower miniatures.” Her four-stamp set commemorated the Royal National Rose Society by rendering detailed depictions of the Elizabeth of Glamis, Grandpa Dickson, Rosa Mundi, and Sweet Briar varieties. Rosenberg's work subsequently expanded into the wider philatelic market through her production of illustrated first day covers and commemorative presentation envelopes for various Royal and Commonwealth events.

With regard to previous monarchs, stamps were issued in 1987 to mark the 150th anniversary of Queen Victoria's accession, and in 1997 to mark the 450th anniversary of King Henry VIII's death. From 2008 to 2011 stamps were issued featuring all of England's kings and queens and also the Scottish House of Stuart.

In February 2022 new barcoded "definitive design" stamps were introduced. The rectangular (matrix) codes, unique to each stamp, use a trademarked coding designed to prevent counterfeiting and to enable tracking of letters, and to enable correspondents to link digital content to their stamps. Until 2022 any 1st and 2nd class and decimal currency postage stamps could be used; old Machin and country definitive design stamps without barcodes are no longer valid from 31 July 2023, with old ones exchangeable for barcoded ones indefinitely through a process which Royal Mail calls the "Stamp Swap Out scheme". Special stamps with pictures and Christmas stamps without a barcode continued to be valid. Stamps are exchanged like-for-like: a "1st class" stamp will be replaced by a 1st class one, not 95p.

== Country definitives ==
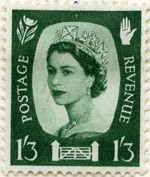
1/3d value Northern Ireland country definitive, a design used later for the 1/6 issue

Beginning in 1958, country definitives (initially known as regional issues) were introduced in the Channel Islands, the Isle of Man, Northern Ireland, Scotland and Wales. England-specific issues were added later, starting with the World Cup – England Winners commemorative stamp in 1966. While these issues are only sold at post offices in the respective countries, the English, Northern Irish, Scottish and Welsh issues are valid throughout the United Kingdom. The Channel Islands (since 1969) and Isle of Man (since 1973) now issue their own stamps which are not valid anywhere else.

== British postal services abroad ==
The United Kingdom has introduced postal services throughout the world and has often made use of British definitives bearing local overprints.

== See also ==
- List of British postage stamps
- List of people on stamps of the United Kingdom
- London Penny Post
- Penny Blue
- Post Office (United Kingdom)
- The British Postal Museum & Archive
- Revenue stamps of the United Kingdom
