= England (British postage stamps) =

England was included in a set of special commemorative postage stamps issued by the Royal Mail in 2006 to celebrate the component nations in the United Kingdom. The stamps featuring England were the final part of the British Journey series, which had previously featured Scotland, Northern Ireland, and Wales. They were available as mint stamps, as a presentation pack, stamps cards, and a first day cover.

== British Journey series ==
These stamps were the final issue in the British Journey series; which started in 2003 with Scotland, followed in 2004 with Northern Ireland and Wales, and South West England in 2005. The series was brought to a premature end with this issue due to a lack of popularity amongst collectors.

== Stamp details ==
The stamps were issued as a block of stamps, five wide by two deep. The photographs selected for this issue show no sky but are intended to demonstrate the colours and textures of the United Kingdom. All values are first class.

=== Photos ===
- Carding Mill Valley, Shropshire
- Beachy Head, Sussex
- St Paul's Cathedral, London
- Brancaster on the Norfolk coast
- Derwent Edge in Derbyshire's Peak District
- Robin Hood's Bay, Yorkshire
- Buttermere in the Lake District
- Chipping Campden in the Gloucestershire Cotswold hills
- St Boniface Down, Isle of Wight
- Chamberlain Square, Birmingham

=== Details ===
- Designed by Phelan Barker Design
- Stamp Size 35mm x 35mm (Square)
- Printed by De La Rue Security Print
- Print Process Photogravure
- Perforations 14.5 x 14.5
- Gum PVA

=== Presentation pack ===
The presentation pack was written by Simon Calder, travel editor of the Independent newspaper. He also wrote the pack for the airliners issue.

== See also ==
- List of British postage stamps
- List of postage stamps
