= Halfpenny Rose Red =

Victorian postage stamp

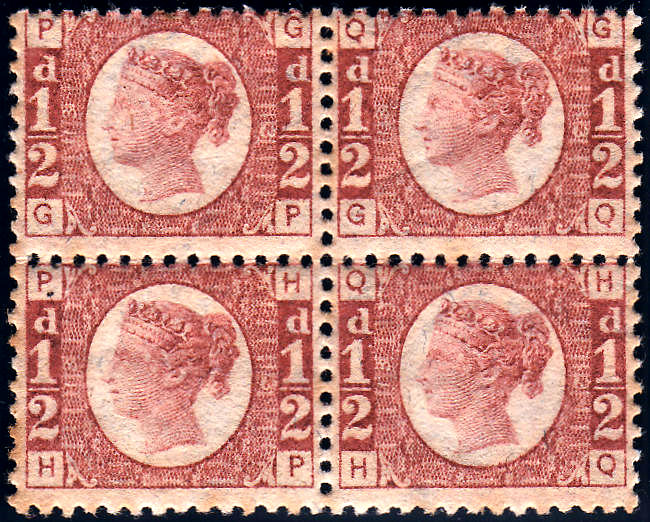
- Country of production: United Kingdom
- Date of production: 1 October 1870 – 1880
- Depicts: Queen Victoria
- Notability: First halfpenny UK stamp; Smallest UK stamp
- Face value: 1/2d

The Halfpenny Rose Red, first issued on 1 October 1870, was the first halfpenny postage stamp issued in the United Kingdom.

The halfpenny stamp was introduced following a reduction in the postal rate for newspapers and postcards. It was designed to be approximately half the size of the corresponding one penny stamp and is notable for being the smallest UK postage stamp ever issued at 17.5 mm × 14 mm (0.69 in × 0.55 in).

The stamps (nicknamed "Bantams" due to their small size) were printed in sheets of 480 (20 horizontal rows of 24 stamps). They were line engraved and featured a bust of Queen Victoria in profile with "½d" on either side.

A plate number was engraved in the design, in the left and right side lace work. The plates were numbered from 1 to 20, but plates 2, 7, 16, 17, and 18 were not completed, plates 21 and 22 were not used and plate 9 is now scarce because it was a rarely used reserve plate. The stamps were watermarked with the word "halfpenny" that extended across three stamps.

The stamp was replaced in 1880 by the surface printed Halfpenny Green stamp.

== See also ==
- List of British postage stamps
- Postage stamps and postal history of Great Britain
