= Morris Giwelb =

Stamp dealer

- Born: 1853
- Died: 1937 (aged 83–84)
- Occupation: Stamp dealer

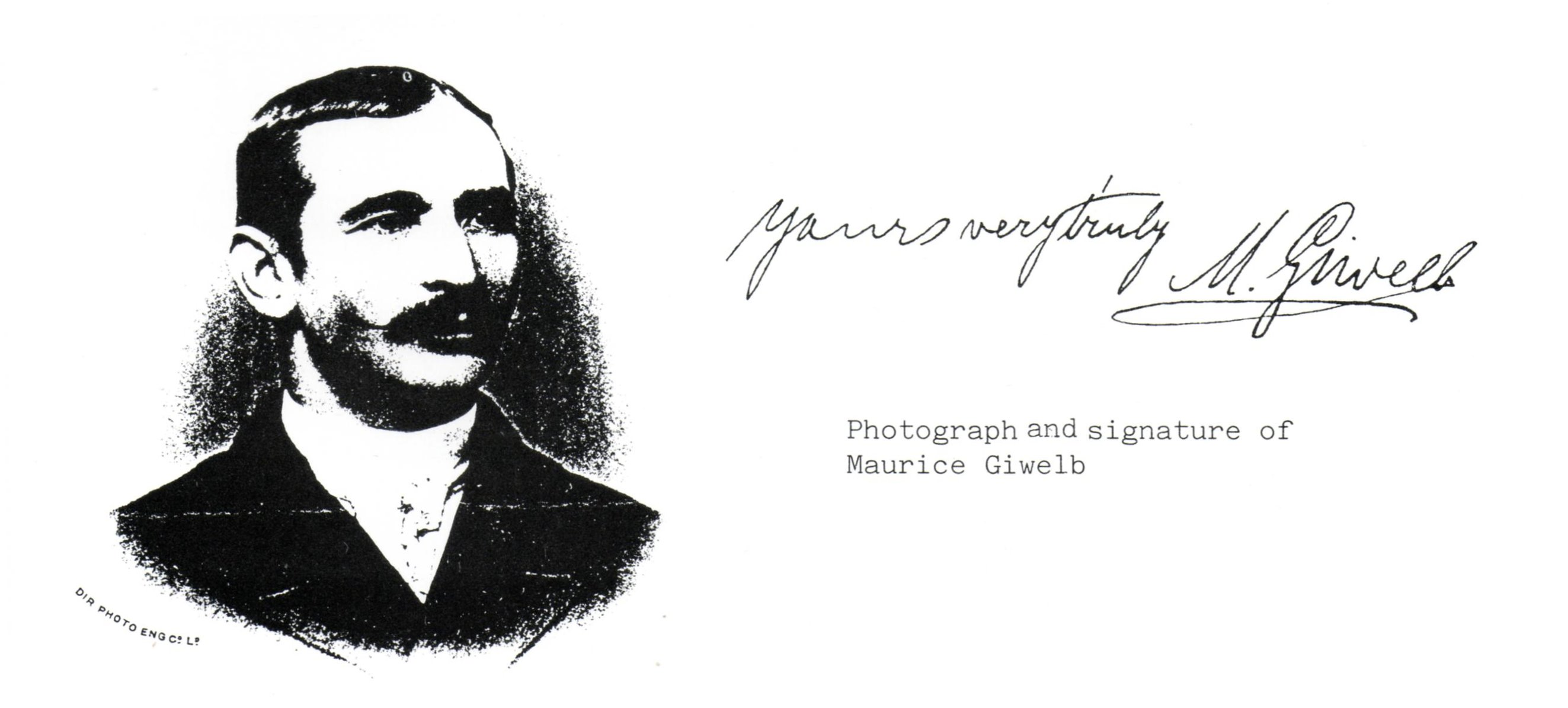
Morris Giwelb in about 1891.

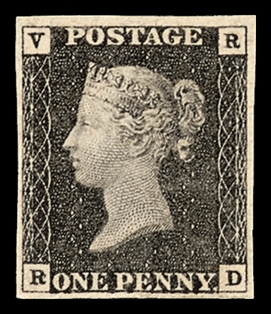
A genuine Penny Black VR official.

Morris Giwelb (1853 – March 1937) was a British stamp dealer, originally from the Province of Warsaw in Russian Poland, who, in his prime, became one of the most important dealers in the great rarities of philately.

He emigrated to England in 1882 and became a naturalized British citizen in 1887. Giwelb was noted for his genial and unassuming nature which contrasted with the rarity of the material in which he dealt. He owned a modest shop in Leicester Square and later the Strand, before eventually retiring to Brighton with his wife Natalie.

Giwelb was responsible for the unmasking of the forger Dr. Bernhardt Assmus, after he bought forged Penny Black VR official stamps from Assmus in August, 1890. He accompanied the police on a visit to Assmus' premises at 12 Church Street, Islington, and assisted them at Vine Street Police Station in sorting the seized material.

His wife was Natalie Giwelb.
