= Two Penny Blue =

United Kingdom postage stamp

Two Penny Blue (1841 second 'white line' issue)
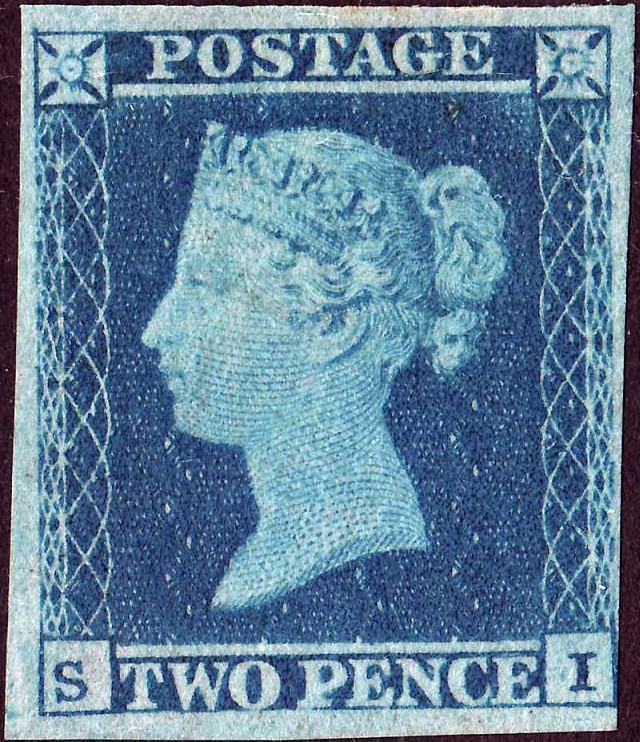
- Country of production: United Kingdom
- Date of production: 6 May 1840
- Perforation: None
- Depicts: Queen Victoria
- Notability: World's second official postage stamp
- Face value: 2d

The Two Penny Blue, or Two Pence Blue (and colloquially known as the Tuppenny Blue) was the world's second official postage stamp, produced in the United Kingdom of Great Britain and Ireland and issued after the Penny Black.

Initial printing took place from 1 May 1840, and in all 6,460,000 were printed from two plates until 29 August. Officially the stamps were valid for postage from 6 May. It was first sold to the public at the London Inland revenue office on 6 May 1840. Except for its denomination, the design is exactly the same as the Penny Black and was struck from the same die.

It was originally intended that the 2d blue be issued at the same time as the 1d black; the earliest postmark seen on one of these is 6 May 1840. The first issues of this value (intended for double rate letters) were printed from plates 1 and 2. The printing plates were destroyed in 1843. Copies of the stamp are now significantly rarer and more expensive than the Penny Black.

Later when the colours of the stamps were being revised, the inks chosen were red-brown for the penny value and a new blue ink for the two pence value. As the printed stamps in the new ink looked the same as the original issue, it was decided to add a horizontal line at the top and bottom of the label so as the newer printings could be easily identified. Printing of the revised stamps began on 27 February 1841 and was placed on sale in March. These are referred to as the white lines added issue, as pictured above. They are more common than the original 1840 printing.

Several differences exist in the post-1841 stamps due to watermark, perforation, paper and type variations. In all the 1840–80 series of this design used 15 plates.

The Penny Black allowed a letter weighing up to half an ounce to be sent anywhere within Britain or Ireland; the Two Penny Blue's weight limit was a full ounce.

== See also ==
- Penny Black
- Penny Blue
- Penny Red
- Penny Black VR official
- List of British postage stamps
