= Bernhardt Assmus =

German stamp forger

Bernhardt Burghardt Assmus
- Criminal charge: Forgery

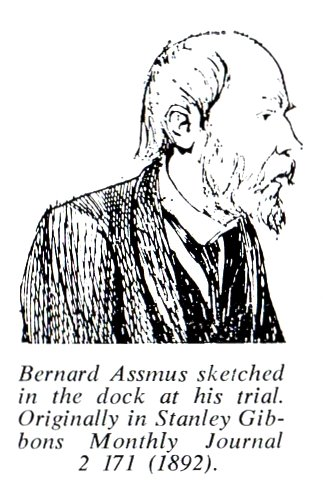
Assmus in the dock.

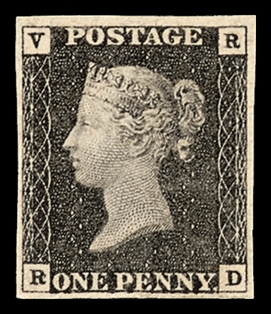
A genuine Penny Black VR official.

Bernhardt Burghardt Assmus (c. 1855–unknown) was a German stamp forger operating in London. He was originally from Hamburg.

He was unmasked after Morris Giwelb bought forged Penny Black VR official stamps from him in August 1890. Giwelb accompanied the police on a visit to Assmus' premises at 12 Church Street, Islington, and assisted them at Vine Street Police Station in sorting the seized material.

He was found guilty of fraud in 1892.
