= Penny Black VR official =

United Kingdom postage stamp

Penny Black VR Official
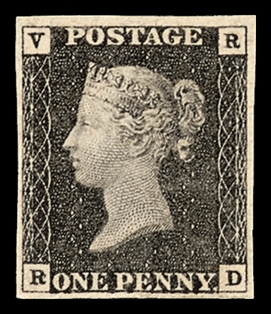
- Country of production: United Kingdom
- Location of production: London
- Date of production: May 1840
- Depicts: Queen Victoria
- Nature of rarity: Few exist
- No. in existence: Unknown
- Face value: 1 penny £sd
- Estimated value: US $20,000

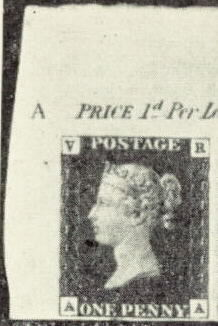
The plate is indicated by the letter A, in upper-left corner of the margin of the sheet.

The VR official was one of three postage stamps introduced by the United Kingdom of Great Britain and Ireland in May 1840 for the pre-payment of postage. While the Penny Black and the Two Penny Blue were for use by the general public, as were the Mulready envelopes and letter sheets, the VR official was for use on official mail. In appearance the VR Official was the same as the issued Penny Black except that the Maltese crosses in the top corners were removed and replaced by the letters V and R, hence its common name.

The plate layout for this issue was the same in almost all respects as that used for the Penny Black and the Two Penny Blue produced at the same time. The only difference in the marginal inscription was the plate identification which was shown as a letter, (see picture), rather than a number as used on the general issue of postage stamps.

The idea of this stamp was that it would be used on official correspondence from government departments. However, the public dislike and mockery of the Mulready envelope and letter sheets led to vast numbers of the Mulreadies being issued to the various departments, with the tax office being the heaviest user.

Since existing stocks could be used, the idea of the official stamp was abandoned. Nearly all of the supplies which had been printed were destroyed on 25 January 1843. Twenty-one sheets survived, a few of the stamps passed (invalidly) through the posts, and Rowland Hill used some to experiment with cancellation techniques.

== Forgeries ==
The stamp was forged by Bernhardt Assmus in August 1890 who was unmasked by the dealer Morris Giwelb, to whom he had sold a forged copy of the stamp.

== See also ==
- List of British postage stamps
- List of notable postage stamps

== References and sources ==
Sources

- Stanley Gibbons Great Britain Volume 1, 14th revised edition. Stanley Gibbons. 2006. ISBN 0852596286.
- The One Penny VR The British Postal Museum & Archive
