= England Winners stamp =

1966 commemorative stamp

England Winners
- Country of production: United Kingdom
- Date of production: 18 August 1966
- Designer: David Gentleman
- Printer: Harrison & Sons
- Perforation: 14×15
- Commemorates: England's 1966 FIFA World Cup victory
- Face value: 4d

The England Winners stamp was a fourpenny commemorative stamp issued in 1966 to mark England's victory in the 1966 FIFA World Cup. The stamp was issued on the orders of the then Postmaster General Edward Short and created by a new printing of the lowest value of the three British 1966 FIFA World Cup stamps with the words ENGLAND WINNERS added.

== Availability ==
The stamp was issued on 18 August 1966 in England, Wales, The Channel Islands and the Isle of Man but not in Scotland or Northern Ireland. It was available in Scotland from 22 August 1966. Following a question asked in the British Parliament, a government minister explained that while British special stamps (commemorative stamps) were normally available throughout the United Kingdom, the government had felt that "...it was not appropriate for this particular stamp to be put on general sale in other countries which had also competed in this FIFA World Cup." In other words, it would not have been diplomatic to sell a stamp celebrating an English victory in Wales or Scotland whose teams had been knocked out of the competition.

== A speculative bubble ==
Stocks of the stamp quickly ran short with queues forming at Post Offices and stamp dealers unable to obtain stock for their customers. A speculative bubble developed with copies of the stamp selling for many times their original cost, and people buying whole sheets of stamps as an investment. The Evening Times in Scotland reported that

It may well be that stamps will turn out to be the investment of 1966. Outstanding example, of course, was last month's issue of the fourpenny England Winners stamp. The price went up to 2s 6d on the day of issue. An eventual price of 15s to £1 is being talked of...

Whole sheets of stamps of 120 are still regularly found for sale which are believed to be from stock bought for investment in 1966, and the prices they obtain are much less than the cost on issue, when accounting from inflation. According to James Mackay, a forgery of the stamp exists.

== Technical details ==
The stamp was designed by David Gentleman and printed by Harrison & Sons. 12,452,640 stamps were sold. Unlike the original, the new stamp had no phosphor bands. The stamp was printed on chalk-surfaced paper and perforated 14 (horizontal) x 15 (vertical). It had a watermark of Multiple Crowns sideways.

No official presentation pack was produced for this stamp. Privately produced packs exist.

== The 1970 FIFA World Cup ==
The British Post Office thought that England might win the 1970 FIFA World Cup too. They did not, but designs for commemorative stamps were prepared by David Gentleman which were re-discovered in 2010.
