= Millennium stamp =

Type of postage stamp

A Millennium stamp is a postage stamp issued by a postal administration commemorating a millennium associated with that country's history but several countries issued stamps for the beginning of the 3rd millennium in same cases depicting some of their country's achievements over the preceding years.

== Canada ==
Canada Post released 68 specially designed stamps as a series of 17 Millennium souvenir sheets, each depicting four different stamps, starting 17 December 1999 through to 17 March 2000. It is not clear, at the present date, whether these issues were justified by any rational policy – or, perhaps, may have been primarily to raise cash from collectors – seventeen four-stamp sets in about thirteen weeks.

== Fiji ==
Fiji released a series of eight stamps depicting some of the flora and fauna of the island nation, being concepts by four artists, Joe Nasau, Jane Borg, Muni Deo Raj and fourteen-year-old Myron Williams.

== United Kingdom ==
1999; Freddie Mercury (with Queen bandmate Roger Taylor in background)

=== 1999 ===
In 1999 Royal Mail issued a series of stamps that were classified into 12 groups (known as "tales") including Entertainment, Science & Technology and Sport, with one group released in each month during the year. The set issued in September 1999 called The Farmers' Tale contained a 19p stamp that doubled as Royal Mail's contribution to that year's Europa postage stamp issue, which was on the theme of Parks and Reserves.

One of the most notable postage stamps in the collection was one commemorating the life of Queen frontman (and avid stamp collector) Freddie Mercury. It caused controversy for the appearance of Roger Taylor in the background at the drums, as it was an understood rule at the time that the only living people allowed to appear on British stamps could be members of the British royal family. However, Sir Francis Chichester had appeared on a Royal Mail postage stamp, while still alive, in 1967.

Other stamps featured: English football hero Bobby Moore; a picture of the structure of DNA; and a fossil of Archaeopteryx, the first known bird.

The pack called "Entertainers' Tale" was – 19p : Freddie Mercury (photo, Mercury's Magic/P Blake); 26p : Bobby Moore (artwork, World Cup/M White); 44p : Dalek (photo, Doctor Who/Lord Snowdon) and 64p : Charlie Chaplin (artwork, Chaplin's Genius/Ralph Steadman).

2000; Scottish Seabird Centre

=== 2000 ===
These stamps commemorated a selection of projects throughout the UK which had received funding from the Millennium Commission. The stamps were released in 12 monthly sub-collections with 4 stamps apiece, making a total of 48 stamps. So, in 1999 and 2000, some 96 millennium stamps.

The stamps featured such projects as the Eden Project, the Tate Modern art gallery, the National Space Centre and the Scottish Seabird Centre.

== Ireland ==
=== Dublin millennium ===
The millennium of Dublin, Ireland, was celebrated in 1988 when An Post issued a 28-pence stamp available both as individual stamps and in a stamp booklet. The Dublin Millennium booklet was the first to contain commemorative stamps; until then all Irish stamp booklets had only contained definitive stamps.

=== Year 2000 ===
During 1999 and 2000 a series of 24 stamps was issued depicting a selection of Irish and world-famous people, such as, Grace Kelly, Nelson Mandela, Thomas Edison and Ludwig van Beethoven and some significant events in Irish history like, Flight of the Earls, Land League and Irish Independence.

== Hong Kong SAR ==
Hong Kong SAR issued gold millennium stamps.

== Laos ==
Laos issued a miniature sheet of four stamps, showing a Laotian landscape, and, on the selvage, fireworks bursting high in the sky.

== Tonga ==
Tonga – which was 'first to the millennium', issued a miniature sheet. The stamps (2) are circular.

== See also ==
- History of Dublin
- Postage stamps of Ireland
