= Penny Blue =

English postage stamp proof

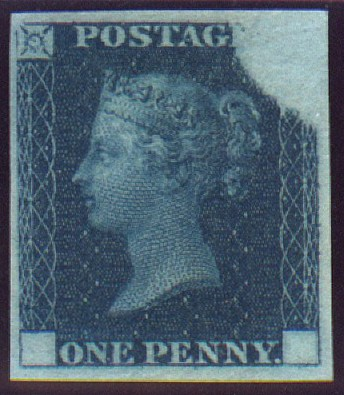
- Country of production: United Kingdom of Great Britain and Ireland
- Location of production: London
- Date of production: 1840
- Nature of rarity: Colour trial
- No. in existence: Unknown
- Face value: 1-Penny £sd

The Penny Blue is frequently mistaken for a postage stamp of Britain. It is from a series of proof impressions which were made at the time Rowland Hill was looking at the new colours which were to be used for the stamps which were to replace the Penny Black and the original 1840 issue of the Two Pence Blue.

The decision to change the black stamp to red had already been made, and at the same time the colour of the ink used for the cancellations was to be changed from red to black. Although it had been decided that the two pence value would remain in blue, this was going to be printed using a different ink from that used on the original. (Thus when the stamp was printed it had the addition of white lines added above and below the inscription so that the new printings could be distinguished at a glance).

At the beginning of December 1840, Rowland Hill wished to see what the stamps would look like in the new colours and requested, (in sheet form), examples in the red brown which was to be used for the new one penny stamp as well as two sheets in blue as the choice of colour had not yet been made. The two blues used for the printing were full deep blue and prussian blue.

For the printing of these three sheets, plate 8 constructed for the production of the Penny Blacks was used.

Rowland Hill chose the full deep blue colour for the two pence stamp.

Examples printed in the red-brown shade, if they made it onto postage, would be indistinguishable from later printings which were made in this colour as part of the general issue in 1841.

Die, plate and paper proofs have been a common step in the process of stamp pre-production since the first stamps. These are never usable as postage, and as a result do not constitute being a "postage stamp", rather it is a representation of it, frequently to test the type or colour of ink, how it will react on certain papers, as well as validating the image itself. This was more critical in the early days of stamp production where metal (and sometimes stone or even wooden plates) were used to make the stamp impression, and some inks caused undue wear on the plates.

== Sources ==
- Gibbons-Partridge, J. "Line-Engraved Colours and the 'Penny Blue'". The GB Journal. Vol. 32 No. 4 (September 1994), pp. 78–80.
- Worsfold, Peter. "Penny Red and Penny Blue Revisited". The GB Journal. Vol. 32 No. 2 (May 1994), pp. 36–38.
