= Penny Red =

19th-century British postage stamp

- Date of production: 1841–1879
- Printer: Perkins, Bacon & Co
- Perforation: 1841: none; 1850: 16 gauge (experimental); 1854: 16 gauge; 1855: 14 gauge
- Depicts: Queen Victoria (1837–1901)
- Face value: 1d

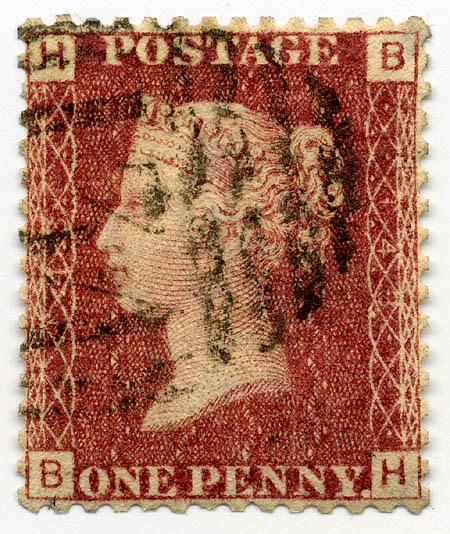
A perforated Penny Red with letters in four corners and plate 148, therefore printed 1871 or later

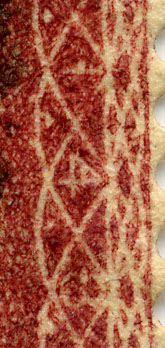
The plate number, 148 in this case, may be found in the margin of the stamp.

The Penny Red was a British postage stamp, issued in 1841. It succeeded the Penny Black and continued as the main type of postage stamp in the United Kingdom of Great Britain and Ireland until 1879, with only minor changes to the design during that time. The colour was changed from black to red because of difficulty in seeing a cancellation mark on the Penny Black; a black cancellation mark was readily visible on a Penny Red.

== History ==
Initially, some of the same plates used to print the Penny Black were used to print the Penny Red. About 21 billion Penny Reds were printed by Messrs. Perkins, Bacon & Co. The stamps were printed in sheets of 240 (20 rows of 12 stamps), so one row cost 1 shilling and a complete sheet one pound. This configuration of 240 stamps per sheet continued with all low-value British postage stamps issued until decimalisation in 1971, when the sheet size was changed to 200 (20 rows of 10 stamps), making the lowest value denomination (half new penny) one pound per sheet. The sheets had no perforations and stamps had to be cut from the sheet using scissors, as with the Penny Black and the early printings of the Two Pence Blue.

Each stamp had unique letters AA, AB etc. in its lower corners, so that its position on the plate could be identified:

Plate configuration
AA	AB	AC	AD	AE	AF	AG	AH	AI	AJ	AK	AL
BA	BB	BC	BD	BE	BF	BG	BH	BI	BJ	BK	BL
•	•	•	•	•	•	•	•	•	•	•	•
•	•	•	•	•	•	•	•	•	•	•	•
•	•	•	•	•	•	•	•	•	•	•	•
SA	SB	SC	SD	SE	SF	SG	SH	SI	SJ	SK	SL
TA	TB	TC	TD	TE	TF	TG	TH	TI	TJ	TK	TL

The upper corners were occupied by stars.

Perforations, in an experimental gauge 16, first came into use in 1850 and were officially adopted in 1854, also in gauge 16. The experimental perforated issue can be distinguished from the general issue as the latter was applied to a stamp that used a different alphabet type for the identifying letters. In January 1855, the perforation size was changed from 16 to 14 as it was found that the sheets were coming apart too easily; the reduced size allowed the sheets to remain intact until pressure was applied to force the separation. The upper corners of each stamp were now occupied by the same identifying letters in reverse.

== Plate numbers ==
On 1 April 1864, the stamp was issued with the plate number engraved in the design, in the left and right side lace work. At this time, the stars in the top corners were also replaced with the same check letters as used in the lower corners, but in reverse order.

Because of wear, over 400 different plates were used to print the Penny Red. Two different basic watermarks were used for the paper, small crown (on the early issues) and large crown, introduced on 15 May 1855. The first stamps printed on the large crown watermarked paper showed two small vertical lines in the central portion of the crown (Type 1). Later printings showed a revised watermark on which these central lines are not present (Type 2).

Stamps from some of the individual plate numbers, such as plate 77, are very rare and in 2016, an example from this plate was auctioned for £495,000.

== Withdrawal ==
The era of the Penny Red came to its close at the end of 1879, along with Perkins Bacon's contract. It was superseded by the Penny Venetian Red printed by De La Rue, which was in use for a little over a year before being succeeded in turn by the long-lived Penny Lilac. Since then, the stamp has become in demand amongst stamp collectors.

== Chronology ==
- 10 February 1841 – first issue: colour of 1d stamp changed from black to red-brown.
- 1848 – Plates 70 and 71 were rouletted by Henry Archer
- 1850 – Some Alphabet 1 plates were perforated 16 by Henry Archer
- 24 February 1854 – perforations 16 introduced on all Alphabet II plates.
- January 1855 – perforation size changed from 16 to 14.
- 15 May 1855 – watermark changed from small crown to large crown.
- August 1855 – Alphabet III introduced
- 1 April 1864 – Letters in all four corners and plate number engraved on each stamp from plate 71 onwards.
- 27 October 1879 – last plate (225) put to press.
- 3 December 1879 – contract to print the Penny Red formally ended.

== See also ==
- Archer Roulette
- List of British postage stamps
- List of notable postage stamps
- Postage stamps and postal history of Great Britain
