= British embossed postage stamps =

UK postage stamps issued between 1847 and 1854

The adhesive embossed postage stamps of the United Kingdom, issued during the reign of Queen Victoria between 1847 and 1854 exhibit four features which are unique to this issue:

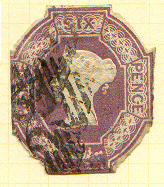
6d lilac embossed postage stamp 'cut to shape'

- The method of production of the dies used for the printing
- The use of silk threaded paper (on two of the values)
- The method of printing (one stamp at a time)
- The use of tinted gum (on the six pence value)

== Issue dates ==
Three values of the octagonal stamps were introduced to cover higher foreign and registered postal charges on the following dates:

1 Shilling (green) - 11 September 1847, 10d (brown) - 6 November 1848, 6d (mauve/lilac/purple) - 1 March 1854

The 1 shilling was the first British postage stamp to bear a value above 2d.

== Embossing ==
The dies used for this type of printing have the embossed, (raised), portions of the stamp design cut away, (recessed), into the metal. The colourless detail as appears on the hair and diadem are achieved by variations in the depth of the engraving.

== The dies ==
The master die was engraved by William Wyon using as his basis the City medal of 1837 which he had also engraved. (This was the same model used for the head engraved on the Penny Black).

The original master die did not show the pendant curl at the back of the hair and was not used in this form on the postage stamps, although it was used at the Royal Mint for coinage.

From this master, a series of sub-dies were made and the curl added to the back of the hair. As such the curl differs on each value. Also added to the dies, after the outer design had been completed, was a die number. This takes the form of a number with the letters W W either before or after and appears at the base of the neck of Queen Victoria.

== Paper ==
For the ten pence and one shilling values, Dickinson silk thread paper was used. The threads are blue and are embedded into the paper at the time of manufacture.

The paper used for the six pence value was watermarked with the letters V R which were arranged so that it appeared complete on each impression.

== Tinted gum ==
Tinted gum was introduced on the six pence value following a printing which was made in error on the gummed side of the paper. Prior to the introduction of the tinted gum, it was colourless.

== Printing ==
The presses used for the embosses dies, allowed for only one stamp to be printed at a time. This method of production meant that the spacing on the sheets varied from wide spacing, (which is uncommon), to very narrow which is why examples with four margins are rare. In some cases the impressions were impressed overlapping each other by quite a large amount.

The stamps were embossed, (printed), at Somerset House. Early collectors would often cut the stamps to shape retaining only the embossed central design and cut square examples are much more valuable.

== Replacement ==
In 1856 after the European postage rate was reduced the stamps were replaced by surface printed issues.
