= Edward VIII postage stamps =

United Kingdom postage stamp series

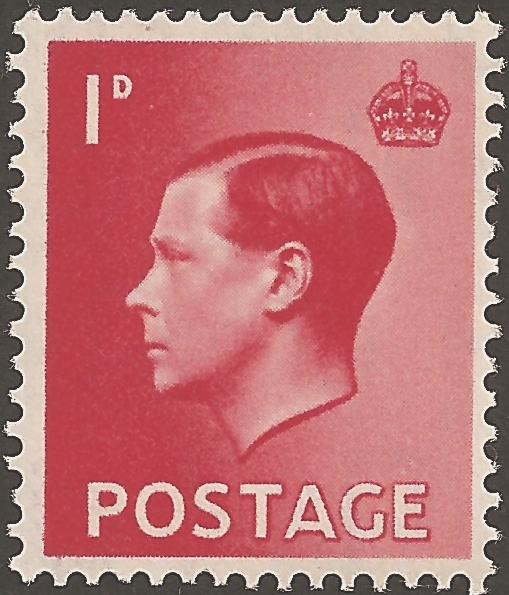
One of four 1936 stamps

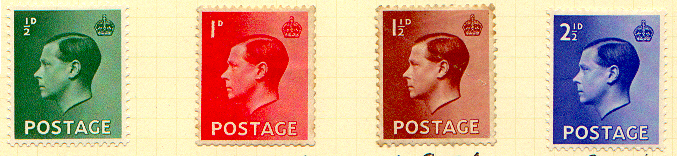
The complete British series

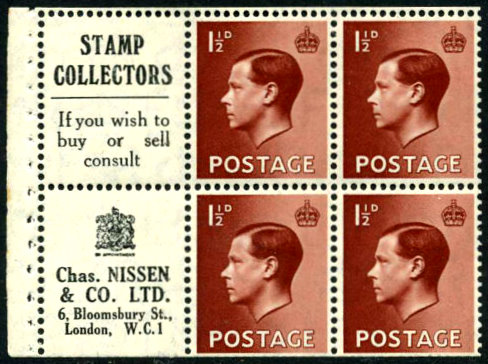
British stamps in a booklet pane featuring advertising for stamp dealer Charles Nissen

The Edward VIII postage stamps are a definitive stamp series issued in the United Kingdom during the 20 January – 11 December 1936 reign of King Edward VIII.

== The definitive issue ==
The profile portrait chosen was taken by Hugh Cecil's studio. The design was suggested by H.J. Brown, an 18-year-old man, and sent in February 1936 to the postal authorities. It inspired Harrison and Sons printers. The only graphic decorations on the stamp were the crown, the denomination in the upper corners, and the word "POSTAGE" at the bottom. Brown's project, the simplest of all submissions, placed the words "POSTAGE" and "REVENUE" on the lateral sides. The Post Office wrote to Mr Brown telling him that his proposed design could not be used. After the stamp came out, clearly using Brown's design, Brown's father issued a statement regretting the Post Office's deceit.

Watermarked with a crown and "E8R", the 1/2d green, the 1 1/2d brown and the 2 1/2d blue stamps were issued on 1 September 1936, and the one penny red on 14 September. After Edward's abdication, there was the usual delay in designing and distributing the stamps of George VI. Thus, the Edward VIII stamps remained on sale for months. That, and the large numbers saved by the public, have kept their collector value very low.

== Morocco Agencies ==
The four or part of the four stamps were overprinted to be used in the British post offices in Morocco. For Tangier, the name of the town was overprinted alone. "MOROCCO / AGENCIES" was overprinted with a new face value in French centimes or Spanish céntimos depending on the zone of the post office.

== Other stamp projects ==
=== United Kingdom ===
As soon as the beginning of the reign in January 1936, the British Post Office was preparing two other issues in addition to this "accession issue" of four definitive stamps: work was done at the Post Office and at Harrison & Sons were done for a "Coronation issue", previewed for the 12 May 1937, and a final "Definitive issue". Essays for the former were made with the King wearing different military uniforms, such as Bertram Park's pictures of Edward VIII wearing Seaforth Highlander and Welsh Guard uniforms. In March 1936, the King accepted the idea of larger stamps picturing his effigy and castles. But the abdication stopped all design efforts (despite essays having been made).

=== Australia ===
The 2d red stamp project of Australia used a photograph of the King in uniform. The sole ornaments were the denomination in an oval in the bottom right corner and the red "POSTAGE" bar at the bottom. Printing of this stamp began in September 1936 at the Commonwealth Bank of Australia's printing branch. All operations were stopped with the abdication.

Despite the destruction of the stock and all material needed for the printing, a signed corner block of six 2d red stamps is in the hands of a British collector. On 29 September 1936, William Vanneck, 5th Baron Huntingfield, Governor of Victoria, visited the plant and was invited to sign and date one of the finished sheets. In the name of the Commonwealth Bank, printer John Ash offered the sheet to the Governor in October, but had to claim it back on 16 December. The sheet was given back the next day, but the six stamp corner block bearing the signature was missing. The Governor had already sent it to someone in England and could not retrieve it.

=== Canada ===
In Canada, the Edward VIII stamp dies and proofs were officially destroyed on 25 and 27 January 1937; some essays were kept in the archives, and the two plaster casts were saved by coin engraver Emmanuel Hahn and a postal officer.

In March 1936, the Canadian Post Office received the photographic profile the new King wanted to be used, and in June it obtained the one received by the Royal Mint. The Canadian Bank Note Company worked on traditional ornamented designs with the two pictures with the help of the American Banknote Company. In October, the Post Office received a plaster cast by British artist Hugh Paget. Finally, on 1 December 1936, the project was accepted by Lord Tweedsmuir, the Governor-in-Council. Two die-proofs were sent to London for the King to approve, but arrived after the abdication and were brought back to Canada.

The prepared design was used with a Bertram Park portrait of King George VI; this permitted an issue on 1 April 1937.

=== Falkland Islands ===
For the Falkland Islands, George Roberts redrew photographs of the archipelago's fauna, human activities and coat of arms. These illustrations were inscribed inside a rectangular frame bearing two upper corner circles: the right side one for a crown and the left one for the profile of the King, from the same picture as the British issued series.

After the abdication, the projects were reworked by Roberts. Edward VIII's profile in a circle was replaced by a picture of King George VI in an oval, with his military collar still visible. The stamp series was issued on 3 January 1938.
