= Presentation pack =

Set of stamps issued for collectors

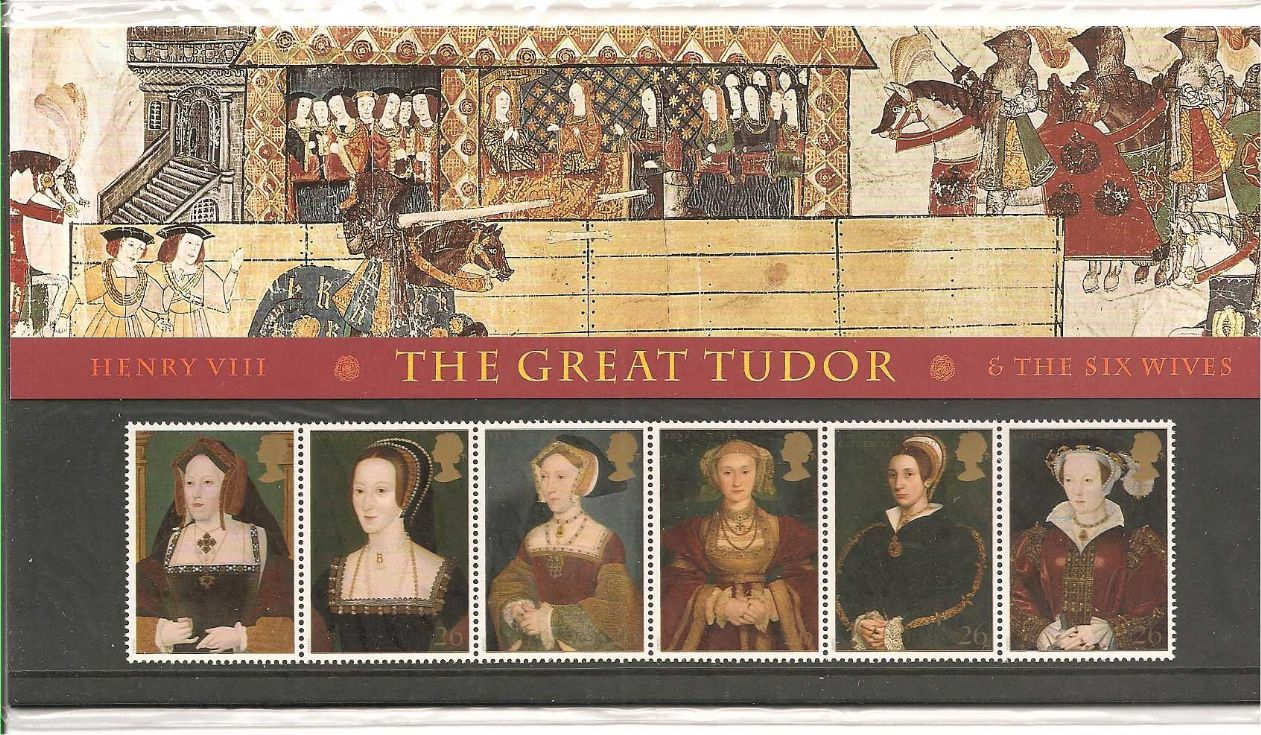
A British presentation pack from 1997 for the Great Tudor issue commemorating Henry VIII

A presentation pack typically contains a full set of a new stamp issue, produced for philatelists and stamp collectors. It normally comprises a folded card containing detailed notes about the stamps, a card with clear strips for holding the actual stamps, all held within a clear sleeve. The packs are usually sold at a price a little above the stamps' face value.

== History ==
The United Kingdom's postal service was one of the first to produce commemorative presentation packs, with the first presentation packs being issued by the General Post Office (GPO) in 1960, when the GPO was looking for a convenient way of packaging and selling sets of stamps for the London 1960 International Stamp Exhibition, held at the Royal Festival Hall. They produced four packs priced in pounds sterling for the exhibition, and another four priced in US dollars for a Post Office sales tour of the US. Each pack was fairly basic in design and the only information printed on the pack was a brief description of the stamps and the retail price. These first presentation packs were produced in very limited numbers and are now commonly known as Forerunners.

It was in 1964 that the first commemorative packs were produced by the GPO. On 23 April, the first 'proper' pack was issued for a set of stamps celebrating the Shakespeare Festival, to mark the 400th Anniversary of the birth of William Shakespeare. The presentation pack was decorative in design and contained information on the stamp designs, the designer and the stamp printer. Early packs were not produced in large numbers and are highly sought after by collectors. The pack for the "Opening of the Forth Road Bridge" stamps has a catalogue value of £400 according to the 2010 Stanley Gibbons "Great Britain Concise Stamp Catalogue", though they sell on the open market for considerably less. The early packs issued in the 1960s had tight cellophane sleeves causing some to shrink, in turn leading to buckling of the information cards.

The Post Office viewed the presentation pack as a sales tool to attract new customers and impulse buyers. They also developed the range to encourage stamp collecting in other countries, particularly Germany and Japan, by printing packs in those languages.

Many countries around the world (Australia etc.) now issue presentation packs in similar formats, being a convenient way to sell and display a whole stamp issue.

== Categories of British Presentation Packs ==
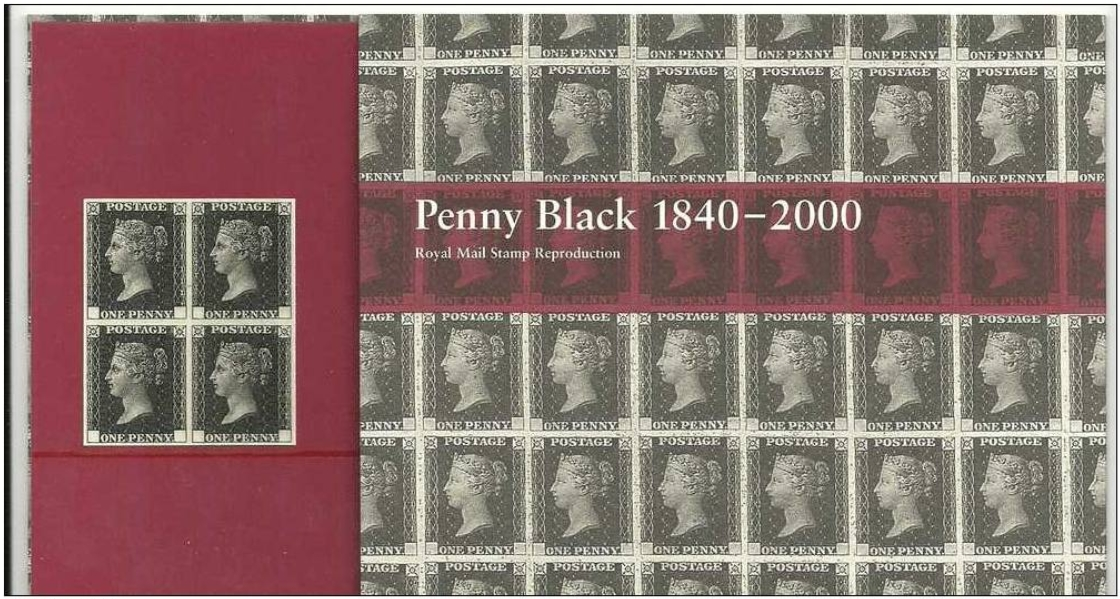
The pack for the facsimile Penny Blacks produced by Royal Mail for a 2000 stamp exhibition (PPR1)

Since the first Commemorative Presentation Pack in 1964, there has been an increasing variety of British Presentation Packs released each year. The Presentation Packs have a wide range of subject matter which can be divided into the following categories:

Commemorative Packs – The most frequently produced and popular packs amongst collectors. They are released by the Royal Mail on the day that the stamps are issued and contain an information card to provide details and images relating to the theme of the stamps. The design of Commemorative Packs continually evolve, with many now containing a stamp Miniature Sheet displayed on the front, or on the reverse. Two Commemorative Packs have been specifically translated into Welsh. The first, the 1969 Investiture of The Prince of Wales, was given to the school children of Wales. The second pack was issued in 1998 for Diana, Princess of Wales, which has proved very popular with collectors.

Definitive Packs – These packs provide information on the background to Definitive and Country stamps issued by the Royal Mail. The first Definitive Packs were issued on 5 March 1969 – one pack of low value pre-decimal Machin stamps and the other with high value pre-decimal Machin stamps.

Collectors Club Packs – The Collectors Club was set up to promote stamp collecting for children, as a family activity. It became one of the largest clubs of its kind with 70,000 members worldwide. Only three Presentation Packs were issued specifically for the Collectors Club and they are now difficult to obtain.

Forerunner Packs – Packs known as Forerunners are considered by many to be the first Presentation Packs issued. They were the inspiration of Frank Langfield, who was developing the philatelic retail department of the General Post Office by promoting stamps to the UK and US. They were first sold in July 1960 at the International Stamp Exhibition held at Festival Hall, London.

Format Packs – These stamp Format Packs were specialist products issued by the Royal Mail and contained gutter pairs, cylinder blocks, traffic lights or top left corner of the selvedge of certain stamp issues within a sealed cellophane cover. They were sold at face value, available from the Philatelic Bulletin and selected Post Offices.

Greetings Packs – Greeting stamps were produced in booklet format. They were first available within a 1992 Presentation Pack. Each pack contained ten 1st Class stamps along with the corresponding labels. Altogether, from 1992 to 1997, six different Greeting Packs were produced.

Miniature Sheet Collection Packs – The first Miniature Sheet Collection Pack was issued in 2005. Presented in a durable plastic folder. It contained a complete set of the year's miniature sheets with an accompanying information card.

Postage Due (To Pay) Packs – Four Presentation Packs were issued by the Post Office containing Postage Due (To Pay) labels – the first in 1971 and the last in 1994. All the packs contained information on the background of 'To Pay' labels, which were introduced to Great Britain in 1914.

Post & Go Packs – Post & Go Packs were introduced in 2009 and have proved popular with collectors. Originally, these packs did not carry premium pricing as they consisted only of self-adhesive stamps on a simple carrier and information card. Royal Mail continues to issue these packs throughout the year, focussing on a specific theme.

Reproduction Packs – These packs are produced to commemorate special British stamps. The first was issued in 2000 to celebrate the Penny Black. Significant attention to detail goes into the production of these packs, a source of admiration to collectors. For example, the Postal Union Congress London 1929 Reproduction Pack contained stamps produced using the original die but with a watermark effect on the reverse and the word 'facsimile', to clearly distinguish them from the originals.

Smilers for Kids – These packs were launched by the Post Office on 28 October 2008 with four designs featuring well known children's book characters; Peter Rabbit, Almond Blossom, Mr Happy and Noddy. These special packs were created to appeal to children and contained ten self-adhesive 1st Class stamps on a sheet, plus corresponding labels. Also included in the packs were other items, such as 'New Baby' announcement cards or cut-out masks.

Year Books – These books were introduced in 1984 by the Post Office as a luxury item. They are hardback books contained within a rigid sleeve for protection. Each book contains an illustrated chapter on every stamp issue for that year, with a full set of the stamps for the collector to place into slip-in mounts on the appropriate pages. In 1995, the Post Office introduced leather-bound Year Books in limited editions.

Year Packs – These are also known as Gift Packs and Collectors' Packs. The first Year Pack, originally called Gift Pack, was issued at the end of 1967 and contained the stamps for that year. The Royal cypher, embossed in gold on the cover of the pack made this a striking new addition to the GPO product range. In 1968, a Gift Pack was produced containing the commemorative stamps issued between January and August that year. Strangely, the GPO also created a Collectors' Pack, which contained selected stamp issues from 1967 and 1968. From 1969 to 1971, they continued to produce Collectors' Packs containing selected stamps from two years. However, since 1972 packs have been issued with only one year's stamps. The name changed to Year Pack in 1994.

Souvenir and Special Edition Packs – This category contains a wide range of packs varying in style, content and size. They are all produced by Royal Mail; some were distributed by third parties. The first Special Edition Pack was issued in 1969 when the British Ships Commemorative Pack was reprinted for sale on board the Cunard Line Queen Elizabeth II cruise ship. The original pack had noted that the Queen Elizabeth II "sailed on her maiden voyage to New York on 17 January 1969." However, the sailing was delayed so Cunard commissioned a reprint with corrected text reading "sails on her maiden voyage early in 1969."

Private Packs – Over the years, a number of individuals and organisations have produced Private Packs featuring specific Royal Mail stamp issues. Examples of Private Packs include Post Office Missed (also known as POM), Bournemouth and Norwich Packs. Most of these packs are produced by the philatelic departments of national post offices. However, there is nothing to stop anyone from producing a pack by taking a set of stamps and designing their own holder. A number of private packs have been created in Britain to promote products, events, or simply as souvenirs including British Caledonian Airways for the Queen's Silver Jubilee in 1977 and Scottish Wildlife Trust for the 1981 British Butterflies stamps. A more recent Private Pack was produced by the National Assembly of Wales in 2006, for distribution to its members. The pack contained a 2006 Celebrating Wales Miniature Sheet and a specially designed information card detailing the history of the Assembly.
