= United Kingdom commemorative stamps 2000–2009 =

This is a list of the commemorative stamps of the United Kingdom for the years 2000–2009.

== List ==
=== 2000 ===
| Issue number | Issue date | Issue title | Details of stamps in issue | Designer(s) |
2000
| | 2000-01-18 | Above and Beyond | 19p, 26p, 44p, 64p. The 26p design was re-issued on 26 May with a 1st value, this was only found in stamp booklets. | |
| | 2000-02-01 | Fire and Light | 19p, 26p, 44p, 64p | |
| | 2000-03-07 | Water and Coast | 19p, 26p, 44p, 64p | |
| | 2000-04-04 | Life and Earth | 2nd, 1st, 44p, 64p | |
| | 2000-05-02 | Art and Craft | 2nd, 1st, 45p, 65p | |
| | 2000-05-23 | Her Majesty's Stamps | Miniature Sheet featuring five X 1st | |
| | 2000-06-06 | People and Places | 2nd, 1st, 45p, 65p | |
| | 2000-07-04 | Stone and Soil | 2nd, 1st, 45p, 65p | |
| | 2000-08-01 | Tree and Leaf | 2nd, 1st, 45p, 65p | |
| | 2000-08-04 | 100th Birthday of Queen Elizabeth the Queen Mother | Miniature Sheet included four X 27p stamps. A single 27p value stamp was issued, featuring Queen Elizabeth the Queen Mother | |
| | 2000-09-05 | Mind and Matter | 2nd, 1st, 45p, 65p | |
| | 2000-10-03 | Body and Bone | 2nd, 1st, 45p, 65p | |
| | 2000-11-07 | Spirit and Faith (Christmas) | 2nd, 1st, 45p, 65p | |
| | 2000-12-05 | Sound and Vision | 2nd, 1st, 45p, 65p | |

=== 2001 ===
| Issue number | Issue date | Issue title | Details of stamps in issue | Designer(s) |
2001
| | 2001-01-16 | Rights of the Child – Face Paintings | 2nd, 1st, 45p, 65p | Why Not Associates |
| | 2001-02-06 | Occasions Greetings | Five X 1st | Springpoint Designs |
| | 2001-02-13 | Cats and Dogs | Ten X 1st | Johnson Banks |
| | 2001-03-13 | The Weather | 19p, 27p, 45p, 65p and Miniature Sheet featuring all four stamps | H. Brown and T. Meeuwissen |
| | 2001-04-10 | Centenary of Royal Navy Submarine Service | 2nd, 1st, 45p, 65p | D Davis |
| | 2001-05-15 | 150th Anniversary of First Double-decker bus | Five X 1st and Miniature Sheet featuring all five stamps | M. English |
| | 2001-06-19 | Fashion Hats | 19p, 27p, 45p, 65p | Rose Design from photos by N. Knight |
| | 2001-07-10 | Europa. Pond Life | 19p, 27p, 45p, 65p | J. Gibbs |
| | 2001-09-04 | Punch and Judy Show Puppets | 6 X 1st issued se-tenant in horizontal strips. Two stamps featuring 'Punch' and 'Judy' were also issued as self-adhesive stamps in stamp booklets only | K. Bernstein from puppets by Bryan Clarkez |
| | 2001-10-02 | Centenary of Nobel Prizes | 2nd, 1st, E, 40p, 45p, 65p | P. Vermier |
| | 2001-11-06 | Christmas Robins | 5 X self-adhesive stamps. 2nd, 1st, E, 45p, 65p | A. Robins and H. Brown |

=== 2002 ===
| Issue number | Issue date | Issue title | Details of stamps in issue | Designer(s) |
2002
| | 2002-01-15 | Rudyard Kipling | 10 X self-adhesive stamps 1st (Just So Stories). | I. Cohen |
| | 2002-02-06 | Queen's Golden Jubilee | 2nd, 1st, E, 45p, 65p | Kate Stephens |
| | 2002-03-05 | Occasions Greetings | 5 X 1st | |
| | 2002-03-19 | British Coastlines | 10 X 27p: celebrating Britain's 7000 mile-long coastline, including the fishing port of Padstow in Cornwall, the White Cliffs of Dover, St Abb's Head in the Scottish Borders and Newquay beach in Cornwall. | R. Cooke |
| | 2002-04-10 | Circus | 2nd, 1st, E, 45p, 65p. Originally scheduled to be issued on 9 April, but delayed due to the funeral of Queen Elizabeth the Queen Mother | Ron Fuller |
| | 2002-04-25 | Queen Elizabeth the Queen Mother Commemoration | 1st, E, 45p, 65p | J. Gorham from photo by N. Parkinson |
| | 2002-05-02 | Passenger Jet Aviation | 2nd, 1st, E, 45p, 65p | Roundel |
| | 2002-05-21 | World Cup Football | 5 X 1st | Sedley Place |
| | 2002-07-16 | 17th Commonwealth Games | 2nd, 1st, E, 47p, 68p | Madeleine Bennett |
| | 2002-08-20 | Peter Pan | 2nd, 1st, E, 47p, 68p | Tutssels |
| | 2002-09-10 | London Bridges | 2nd, 1st, E, 47p, 68p | Sarah Davies and R. Maude |
| | 2002-10-08 | 150th Anniversary of first pillar box | 2nd, 1st, E, 47p, 68p | Silk Pearce |
| | 2002-11-05 | Christmas | 2nd, 1st, E, 47p, 68p | Rose Designs |
2003

=== 2003 ===
| Issue number | Issue date | Issue title | Details of stamps in issue | Designer(s) |
2003
| | 2003-01-14 | Birds of Prey | 10 X 1st | |
| | 2003-02-04 | Greetings Stamps "Occasions" | 6 X 1st | |
| | 2003-02-25 | 50th Anniversary of Discovery of DNA | 2nd, 1st, E, 47p, 68p | |
| | 2003-03-25 | Fun Fruit and Vegetables | 10 X 1st – Strawberry, Potato, Apple, Red Pepper, Pear, Orange, Tomato, Lemon, Cabbage, Asparagus | |
| | 2003-04-29 | Extreme Endeavours (British Explorers) | 2nd (Amy Johnson), 1st (1953 Everest Expedition Team), E (Freya Stark), 42p (Ernest Shackleton), 47p (Francis Chichester), 68p (Robert Falcon Scott) | |
| | 2003-06-02 | 50th Anniversary of Coronation | 10 x 1st | |
| | 2003-06-17 | 21st Birthday of Prince William of Wales | 28p, E, 47p, 68p | |
| | 2003-07-15 | A British Journey, Scotland | 2nd, 1st, E, 42p, 47p, 68p | |
| | 2003-08-12 | Europa, British Pub Signs | 1st, E, 42p, 47p, 68p | |
| | 2003-09-18 | Classic Transport Toys | 1st, E, 42p, 47p, 68p plus a MS. The 1st Class stamp was also issued in self-adhesive form in a booklet | |
| | 2003-10-07 | 250th Anniversary of the British Museum | 2nd, 1st, E, 42p, 47p, 68p | |
| | 2003-11-04 | Christmas 2003 | 2nd, 1st, E, 42p, 47p, 68p | |
| | 2003-12-19 | England's Victory in Rugby World Cup sheet | Miniature Sheet (2 x 1st and 2 x 68p) | |

=== 2004 ===
| Issue number | Issue date | Issue title | Details of stamps in issue | Designer(s) |
2004
| | 2004-01-13 | Classic locomotives | | |
| | 2004-02-03 | Occasions 2004 | | |
| | 2004-02-26 | The Lord of the Rings | | |
| | 2004-03-16 | Northern Ireland | | |
| | 2004-04-06 | Entente Cordiale (Joint issue with La Poste) | | |
| | 2004-04-13 | Ocean Liners | 1st, E, 42p, 47p, 57p, 68p | |
| | 2004-05-25 | Royal Horticultural Society | | |
| | 2004-06-05 | Wales | | |
| | 2004-08-10 | Royal Society of Arts | | |
| | 2004-09-16 | Woodland Animals | | |
| | 2004-10-12 | Crimea | | |
| | 2004-11-02 | Christmas 2004 | | |

=== 2005 ===
| Issue number | Issue date | Issue title | Details of stamps in issue | Designer(s) |
2005
| | 2005-01-11 | Farm Animals | 10 x first class stamps | C. Wormell |
| | 2005-02-08 | A British Journey: South West England | 6 stamps | J, Phelan and Lissa Barker |
| | 2005-02-24 | 150th Death Anniversary of Charlotte Brontë | 6 stamps | Illustrations by Paula Rego, Designer P. Willberg |
| | 2005-03-15 | Centenary of the Magic Circle | 5 stamps | G.Hardie and Tatham Design |
| | 2005-04-09 | Royal Wedding | Minisheet with 4 stamps | Rose Design |
| | 2005-04-21 | World Heritage Sites | 8 stamps | J.Godfrey |
| | 2005-06-07 | Trooping of the Colour | 6 stamps | A. Altmann |
| | 2005-07-05 | 60th Anniversary of End of the Second World War (Victory in Europe Day) | 5 x 1st (Machin), 1995 Peace and Freedom First Class | J Gorham |
| | 2005-07-19 | Motorcycles | 1st, 40p, 42p, 47p, 60p, 68p | I. Chilvers and M.English |
| | 2005-08-05 | London's Successful Bid for 2012 Olympic Games | Minisheet, 6 x First Class stamps | CDT Design |
| | 2005-08-23 | Europa. Gastronomy. Changing Tastes in Britain | 2nd, 1st, 42p, 47p, 60p, 68p | Catell Ronca |
| | 2005-09-15 | 50th Anniversary of Independent Television | 2nd, 1st, 42p, 47p, 60p, 68p | Kate Stephens |
| | 2005-10-04 | Smilers Booklet (1st series) | 6 x first class | |
| | 2005-10-06 | England Ashes Victory | Minisheet, first class x 2, 68p x 2 | Why Not Associates |
| | 2005-10-18 | Bicentenary of Battle of Trafalgar | 1st x 2, 42p x 2, 68p x 2 | D. Davis |
| | 2005-11-01 | Christmas. Madonna and Child Paintings | 2nd, 1st, 42p, 60p, 68p, £1-12 | Irene von Treskow |

=== 2006 ===
| Issue number | Issue date | Issue title | Details of stamps in issue | Designer(s) |
2006
| | 2006-01-10 | Animal Tales | 2nd x 2, 1st x 2 (Paddington Bear), 42p x 2, 68p x 2 | Rose Design |
| | 2006-02-07 | A British Journey: England | 10 x 1st | Barker Design Consultants |
| | 2006-02-23 | Birth Centenary of Isambard Kingdom Brunel | 1st, 40p, 42p, 47p, 60p, 68p | Hat-trick Design |
| | 2006-03-21 | Ice Age Animals | 1st, 42p, 47p, 68p, £1.12 | A. Davidson and H. Brown |
| | 2006-04-18 | Her Majesty The Queen's 80th Birthday | . | Sedley Place |
| | 2006-06-06 | World Cup Football Championships | 1st, 42p, 44p, 50p, 64p, 72p | Madeleine Bennett |
| | 2006-06-20 | Modern Architecture | 1st, 42p, 44p, 50p, 64p, 72p | Roundel |
| | 2006-07-18 | 150th Anniversary of National Portrait Gallery | 10 x 1st | P. Willberg |
| | 2006-09-21 | Victoria Cross | 1st (Jack Cornwell), 1st (Agansing Rai), 62p (Charles Lucas), 64p (Noel Chavasse), 72p (Albert Ball), 72p (Charles Upham); miniature sheet featuring all six stamps plus a 20p Victoria Cross stamp from the 1990 Gallantry Awards issue; Coin Cover featuring all six stamps plus two uncirculated cupro-nickel commemorative 50p coins (one has the Victoria Cross as its main feature while the second portrays a soldier carrying a wounded comrade) | |
| | 2006-10-03 | Sounds of Britain | 1st (Bollywood and Bhangra), 42p (Africa and the Caribbean), 50p (Celtic), 72p (Jazz and Blues), £1.19 (Latin American Salsa) | |
| | 2006-11-07 | Christmas 2006 | 1st (Father Christmas), 1st Large (Father Christmas), 2nd (Snowman), 2nd Large (Snowman), 72p (Reindeer), £1.19 (Christmas Tree) | |

=== 2007 ===
| Issue number | Issue date | Issue title | Details of stamps in issue | Designer(s) |
2007
| | 2007-01-09 | The Beatles | 1st (With the Beatles), 1st (Sgt. Pepper's Lonely Hearts Club Band), 64p (Help!), 64p (Abbey Road), 72p (Let It Be), 72p (Revolver); Miniature Sheet showing a selection of Beatles memorabilia over four stamps (4x1st), the pictured collector's items include a Beatles guitar, lunchbox, 45 rpm single and a Tea Tray | |
| | 2007-02-01 | Sea Life | 10 different 1st designs, featuring Moon jellyfish, Common starfish, Beadlet anemone, Bass, Thornback ray, Lesser octopus, Common mussels, Grey seal, Shore crab and Common sunstar | |
| | 2007-02-13 | The Sky at Night | 1st (Saturn Nebula C55), 1st (Eskimo Nebula C39), 50p (Helix Nebula C63), 50p (Cat's Eye Nebula C6), 72p (Flaming Star Nebula C31), 72p (The Spindle C53); Medal featuring the image of Sir Patrick Moore on one side and a telescope on the reverse | |
| | 2007-03-01 | World of Invention | 1st (the works of Thomas Telford), 1st (George Stephenson's achievements on the railways), 64p (Alexander Graham Bell), 64p (John Logie Baird), 72p (Tim Berners-Lee), 72p (space travel); Miniature Sheet featuring all six stamps and an original patent drawing by Alan Dower Blumlein; The Prestige Stamp Book written by Adam Hart-Davis which traces the development of communications technology from Roman Roads to the Moon landings. It contains four unique Stamp Panes including Welsh and Scottish Definitives in honour of Thomas Telford | |
| | 2007-03-22 | Abolition of the Slave Trade | 1st (William Wilberforce), 1st (Olaudah Equiano),50p (Thomas Clarkson), 50p (Granville Sharp), 72p (Hannah More), 72p (Ignatius Sancho); limited edition Coin Cover of 20,000 which includes an uncirculated £2 coin bearing a symbolic chain motif on one side | |
| | 2007-04-23 | Celebrating England | 1st (English Definitive Crowned Lion of England), 1st (English Definitive St George Cross Flag), 78p (St George and the Dragon), 78p (Houses of Parliament) – all released as a single miniature sheet | |
| | 2007-05-15 | Beside the Seaside | 1st (Ice cream cone), 46p (Sandcastle), 48p (Merry Go Round), 54p (Beach huts), 69p (Deckchairs), 78p (Donkeys) | |
| | 2007-05-17 | Wembley | miniature sheet featuring four English Definitive stamps (2x2nd and 2x78p) and one commemorative Crowned Lion of England stamp (1st) | |
| | 2007-06-05 | The Machine Definitive | 1st (first Machin stamp), 1st (portrait of Arnold Machin), £1.00 (violet machin – final appearance), £1.00 (ruby machin – first appearance) | |
| | 2007-07-03 | Grand Prix | 1st (1957 Vanwall 2.5L driven by Stirling Moss), 1st (1962 BRM P57 driven by Graham Hill),54p (1963 Lotus 25 Climax driven by Jim Clark), 54p (1973 Tyrell 006/2 driven by Jackie Stewart), 78p (1976 McLaren M23 driven by James Hunt), 78p (1986 Williams FW11 driven by Nigel Mansell) | |
| | 2007-07-17 | Harry Potter | seven 1st featuring the covers of Harry Potter books and a miniature sheet featuring four 1st stamps containing the coats of arms of Gryffindor, Hufflepuff, Ravenclaw and Hogwarts. | |
| | 2007-07-26 | Scouts | 1st (11 of the 12 astronauts who walked on the Moon were once Scouts), 46p (The youngest climber of the highest peaks on all 7 continents was a Scout), 48p (450,000 UK Scouts take part in community projects every year), 54p (Adult Scout volunteers give over 360 million hours of time each year), 69p (The first non-stop solo flight around the world was made by a Scout), 78p (Scouting is the largest youth movement in the world with 28 million members) | |
| | 2007-09-04 | Birds | ten 1st featuring white-tailed eagle, bearded tit, red kite, cirl bunting, marsh harrier, avocet, bittern, Dartford warbler, corncrake, and peregrine | |
| | 2007-09-20 | British Army Uniforms | 1st (NCO Royal Military Police 1999), 1st (Tank Commander 5th Royal Tank Regiment 1944), 1st (Observer Royal Field Artillery 1917), 78p (Rifleman 95th Rifles 1813), 78p (Grenadier Royal Regiment of Foot of Ireland), 78p (Trooper Earl of Oxford's Horse 1661) | |
| | 2007-10-16 | HM The Queen's Diamond Wedding Anniversary | 1st (The Queen and Prince Philip leave St Paul's Cathedral, 15 June 2006), 1st (The Queen and Prince Philip inspect the King's Troop Royal Horse Artillery in Regents Park, 30 April 1997), 54p (The Queen and Prince Philip at the Garter Ceremony, Windsor, 16 June 1980), 54p (The Queen and Prince Philip at Royal Ascot, 1969), 78p (The Queen and Prince Philip at the Premier of The Guns of Navarone, 27 April 1961), 78p (Princess Elizabeth and Lieutenant Philip Mountbatten at Clydebank, 1947); also miniature sheet, coin cover and prestige booklet? | |
| | 2007-11-06 | Christmas 2007 | 1st (The Angel of Goodwill), 2nd (The Angel of Peace), 78p (The Angel of Joy), £1.24 (The Angel of Glory), 1st (Madonna and Child by Lippo di Dalmasio), 2nd (Madonna and Child by William Dyce) | |
| | 2007-11-08 | Lest We Forget 2007 – Passchendaele | miniature sheet featuring a poppy design stamp (1st) and four 78p Country Definitives | |

=== 2008 ===
| Issue number | Issue date | Issue title | Details of stamps in issue | Designer(s) |
2008
| | 2008-01-08 | Ian Fleming's James Bond book covers | 1st (Casino Royale), 1st (Dr. No), 54p (Goldfinger), 54p (Diamonds Are Forever), 78p (For Your Eyes Only), 78p (From Russia, with Love) | |
| | 2008-02-05 | Working Dogs | 1st (Assistance dog), 46p (Mountain rescue dog), 48p (Police dog), 54p (Customs dog), 69p (Sheepdog), 78p (Guide dogs) | |
| | 2008-02-28 | The Houses of Lancaster and York | 1st (Henry IV), 1st (Henry V), 54p (Henry VI), 54p (Edward IV), 69p (Edward V), 69p (Richard III); miniature sheet featuring 1st (Owain Glyndŵr), 1st (Battle of Agincourt), 78p (Battle of Tewkesbury), 78p (William Caxton) | |
| | 2008-03-11 | Celebrating Northern Ireland | 1st (Carrickfergus Castle), 1st (Giant's Causeway), 78p (St Patrick by Clare Melinsky), 78p (Queen's Bridge and the Thanksgiving Beacon) released as a single miniature sheet | |
| | 2008-03-13 | Mayday – Rescue at Sea | 1st (Barra), 46p (Appledore), 48p (Portland), 54p (St Ives), 69p (Lee-on-the-Solent), 78p (Dinbych-Y-Pysgod/Tenby) | |
| | 2008-04-15 | Insects | ten 1st featuring Adonis blue, southern damselfly, red barbed ant, barberry carpet moth, stag beetle, hazel pot beetle, field cricket, silver-spotted skipper, Purbeck mason wasp, noble chafer | |
| 413 | 2008-05-13 | Cathedrals | 1st (Lichfield Cathedral), 48p (Belfast Cathedral), 50p (Gloucester Cathedral), 56p (St David's Cathedral), 72p (Westminster Cathedral), 81p (St Magnus Cathedral); miniature sheet comprising four stamps (2x1st and 2x81p) making up an image of St Paul's Cathedral | |
| | 2008-06-10 | Classic Carry On and Hammer Films | 1st (Carry On Sergeant, 1958), 48p (Christopher Lee's Dracula), 50p (Carry On Cleo), 56p (The Curse of Frankenstein, 1957), 72p (Carry On Screaming!), 81p (The Mummy). | |
| | 2008-07-17 | Airshows | 1st and 50p (The Red Arrows), 48p (RAF Falcons), 56p (Avro Vulcan Prototypes and Avro 707s), 72p (?), 81p (WB Moorhouse) | |
| | 2008-08-22 | Olympic Games (The Handover) | 1st (London Eye), 1st (Corner Tower, Forbidden City), 1st (Tower of London), 1st (Beijing National Stadium) | |
| | 2008-09-18 | Royal Air Force Uniforms | 1st (Drum Major, RAF Central Band 2007; Helicopter Rescue Winchman 1984; Hawker Hunter Pilot 1951), 81p (Lancaster Air Gunner 1944; Plotter, WAAF 1940; Pilot, 1918) | |
| | 2008-09-29 | 50th Anniversary of Country Definitives | | |
| | 2008-10-14 | Women of Distinction | 1st (Millicent Garrett Fawcett), 48p (Elizabeth Garrett Anderson), 50p (Marie Stopes), 56p (Eleanor Rathbone), 72p (Claudia Jones), 81p (Barbara Castle) | |
| | 2008-11-04 | Christmas 2008: Pantomimes | 1st and 1st Large (Aladdin's Genie), 2nd and 2nd Large (Ugly sisters from Cinderella), 50p (Captain Hook from Peter Pan), 81p (Wicked Queen from Snow White). Madonna and Child stamps from Christmas 2007 (1st – Madonna of Humility, 2nd – Madonna and Child) also being reissued. | |
| | 2008-11-06 | Lest We Forget 2008 | 1st (Poppy with image of soldier), 4 x 81p country definitives | |

=== 2009 ===
| Issue number | Issue date | Issue title | Details of stamps in issue | Designer(s) |
2009
| | 2009-01-13 | British Design Classics | 10 stamps: 1st Class X 10: the Supermarine Spitfire (R. J. Mitchell), the Mini Skirt (Mary Quant), the Mini (Sir Alec Issigonis), the Anglepoise Lamp (George Carwardine), Concorde (Aérospatiale-BAC), the K2 telephone box (Sir Giles Gilbert Scott), the Hille Polypropylene Chair (Robin Day), Penguin Books covers (Edward Young), the London Underground Map (Harry Beck), the Routemaster Bus (design team led by AAM Durrant). | |
| | 2009-01-22 | 250th Anniversary Birth of Robert Burns | 2 stamps: 1st Class X 2: A Man's A Man for A' That, Burns portrait (by Alexander Nasmyth), and 4 miniature stamps. | |
| | 2009-01-12 | 200th Anniversary Birth of Charles Darwin | 6 stamps ("jigsaw" shaped stamps symbolising how Darwin's studies of different disciplines formed his new ideas on evolution) + MS. | |
| | 2009-02-26 | Celebrating Wales | MS | |
| | 2009-03-10 | Pioneers of the Industrial Revolution | . | Webb and Webb |
| | 2009-04-21 | Kings & Queens Part 2 (Tudors) | 6 stamps + MS | |
| | 2009-05-19 | Endangered Plants & 250th Anniversary of Kew Gardens | 10 stamps + MS | |
| | 2009-06-16 | Mythical Creatures | 6 stamps | |
| | 2009-07- | Olympic Disciplines | 10 stamps | |
| | 2009-08-18 | Post boxes | MS | |
| | 2009-09-01 | Fire Brigade | 6 stamps | |
| | 2009-09-17 | Royal Navy Uniforms | 6 stamps | |
| | 2009-10-08 | Eminent Britons | 10 stamps: 1st Class X 10: Fred Perry, Henry Purcell, Sir Matt Busby, Mary Wollstonecraft, Sir Arthur Conan Doyle, Donald Campbell, Judy Fryd, Samuel Johnson and Sir Martin Ryle. | |
| | 2009-10-22 | Olympic & Paralympic Games | 20 stamps | |
| | 2009-11-03 | Christmas – The Nativity Story as depicted on church stained glass | 7 stamps + MS + Smilers | |

== Other decades ==
- United Kingdom commemorative stamps 1924–1969
- United Kingdom commemorative stamps 1970–1979
- United Kingdom commemorative stamps 1980–1989
- United Kingdom commemorative stamps 1990–1999
- United Kingdom commemorative stamps 2010–2019
- United Kingdom commemorative stamps 2020–2029

== Acknowledgements ==
- Stanley Gibbons
- Concise Stamp Catalogue
- Gibbons Stamp Monthly
- Royal Mail Stamp Guide
- Royal Mail British Philatelic Bulletin

== See also ==
- Stanley Gibbons
- Stamp Collecting
- List of people on stamps
- Philately
- Stamps
- PHQ Cards
