= Michael Warren =

Michael Warren may refer to:

== Actors and sportsmen ==
- Michael Warren II, American football running back
- Michael Warren (actor) (born 1946), American TV actor and college basketball player
- Michael Warren (footballer) (born 1982), Australian rules footballer
- Mike Warren (baseball) (born 1961), baseball player

== Artists ==
- Michael Warren (artist) (born 1938), British wildlife artist
- Michael Warren (sculptor) (born 1950), Irish sculptor
- Mike Warren (designer) (born 1980), American designer and artist

== Others ==
- Michael Warren (anthropologist), forensic anthropologist and associate professor at the University of Florida
- Michael Warren (bishop) Roman Catholic bishop of Ferns from 1876 to 1884
- Mike Warren (mayor) (born 1964), current mayor of Adamstown
