= List of United Kingdom commemorative stamps =

This list of United Kingdom commemorative stamps deals with commemorative stamps issued by Royal Mail, the postal administration of the United Kingdom.

== History ==
Postage stamps were first used in the United Kingdom of Great Britain and Ireland on 6 May 1840, with the introduction of the world's first adhesive postage stamps, the Penny Black and Two Pence Blue. Until 1924, all British stamps depicted only the portrait of the reigning monarch, with the exception of the 'High Value' stamps (the so-called "Sea Horses" design) issued in 1913, which were twice the size of normal stamps with added pictorial design.

In 1924, the first commemorative stamp was issued for the British Empire Exhibition. There were then occasional issues over the next thirty years, when the frequency of new issues became more regular. From the mid-1960s, in most years, six to nine sets of commemorative stamps have been issued every year. The General Post Office introduced official First Day Covers and Presentation Packs in the mid-1960s and PHQ Cards, postcard sized reproductions of commemorative stamps, have also been issued to accompany every new set of stamps since the mid-1970s.

All of the stamps introduced down to April 1967 were printed on watermarked paper, as were some introduced later that year; from October 1967, all stamps were on unwatermarked paper.

Issue dates of the early British Commemorative stamps, 1924–1969
Issue date	Commemorative Issue	No. in set	Designer(s)
1924
23 April 1924	British Empire Exhibition (dated 1924)	Two (1d, 1 1/2d)	Harold Nelson
1925
9 May 1925	British Empire Exhibition (dated 1925)	Two (1d, 1 1/2d)	Harold Nelson
1929
10 May 1929	9th UPU Congress, London	Five (1/2d, 1d, 1 1/2d, 2 1/2d, £1)	F W Farleigh, Ernest Linzell, Harold Nelson
1935
7 May 1935	Silver Jubilee of George V	Four (1/2d, 1d, 1 1/2d, 2 1/2d)	Barnett Freedman
1937
13 May 1937	Coronation of George VI	One (1 1/2d)	
1940
6 May 1940	Centenary of First Adhesive Postage Stamp	Six (1/2d, 1d, 1 1/2d, 2d, 2 1/2d, 3d)	
1946
11 June 1946	Victory	Two (2 1/2d, 3d)	
1948
26 April 1948	Royal Silver Wedding	Two (2 1/2d, £1)	
29 July 1948	Olympic Games	Four (2 1/2d, 3d, 6d, 1s)	
1949
10 October 1949	75th Anniversary of Universal Postal Union	Four (2 1/2d, 3d, 6d, 1s)	
1951
3 May 1951	Festival of Britain	Two (2 1/2d, 4d)	
3 May 1951	High Value Definitives George VI (This set is not a Commemorative issue, it is the first set of 'Pictorial' High Value Definitives)	Four (2s 6d, 5s, 10s, £1)	
1953
3 June 1953	Coronation of Queen Elizabeth II	Four (2 1/2d, 4d, 1s 3d, 1s 6d)	
1955
September 1955	Castles (Not a Commemorative issue, the 2nd set of 'Pictorial' High Value Definitives)	Four (10s and £1 first issued 1 September, 2s 6d and 5s first issued 23 September)	
1957
1 August 1957	World Scout Jubilee Jamboree	Three (2 1/2d, 4d, 1s 3d)	
12 September 1957	46th Inter-Parliamentary Union Conference	One (4d)	
1958
18 July 1958	6th British Empire & Commonwealth Games	Three (3d, 6d, 1s 3d)	
1960
7 July 1960	Tercentenary of Establishment of General Letter Office	Two (3d, 1s 3d)	Faith Jaques
19 September 1960	1st Anniversary of European Postal & Telecommunications Conference	Two (6d, 1s 6d)	
1961
28 August 1961	Centenary of Post Office Savings Bank	Three (2 1/2d, 3d, 1s 6d)	
18 September 1961	European Postal & Telecommunications (CEPT) Conference, Torquay	Three (2d, 4d, 10d)	
25 September 1961	7th Commonwealth Parliamentary Conference	Two (6d, 1s 3d)	Faith Jaques
1962
14 November 1962	(Introduction of the double issue: Phosphor and Ordinary sets) National Productivity Year	Three (2 1/2d, 3d, 1s 3d) Also issued in Phosphor set.	David Gentleman
1963
21 March 1963	(Introduction of GPO First Day of Issue Postmark) Freedom From Hunger	Two (2 1/2d, 1s 3d) Also issued in Phosphor set.	
7 May 1963	Paris Postal Conference Centenary	One (6d) Also issued in Phosphor set.	
16 May 1963	National Nature Week	Two (3d, 4 1/2d) Also issued in Phosphor set.	
31 May 1963	9th International Lifeboat Conference, Edinburgh	Three (2 1/2d, 4d, 1s 6d) Also issued in Phosphor set.	David Gentleman
15 August 1963	Red Cross Centenary Congress	Three (3d, 1s 3d, 1s 6d) Also issued in Phosphor set.	
3 December 1963	Opening of COMPAC (Trans-Pacific Telephone Cable)	One (1s 6d) Also issued in Phosphor set.	
1964
23 April 1964	(Introduction of GPO Presentation Pack) Shakespeare Festival	Five (3d, 6d, 1s 3d, 1s 6d, 2s 6d) Four (3d, 6d, 1s 3d, 1s 6d) also issued in Phosphor set.	David Gentleman
1 July 1964	20th International Geographical Congress, London	Four (2 1/2d, 4d, 8d, 1s 6d) Also issued in Phosphor set.	
5 August 1964	10th International Botanical Congress, Edinburgh	Four (3d, 6d, 9d, 1s3d) Also issued in Phosphor set.	
4 September 1964	Opening of Forth Road Bridge	Two (3d, 6d) Also issued in Phosphor set.	Andrew Restall
1965
8 July 1965	Winston Churchill Commemoration	Two (4d, 1s 3d) Also issued in Phosphor set.	David Gentleman
19 July 1965	700th Anniversary of Simon de Montfort's Parliament	Two (6d, 2s 6d) One (6d) also issued in Phosphor .	Stewart Black D.A
9 August 1965	Salvation Army Centenary	Two (3d, 1s6d) Also issued in Phosphor set.	
1 September 1965	Centenary of Joseph Lister's discovery of Antiseptic Surgery	Two (4d, 1s) Also issued in Phosphor set.	
1 September 1965	Commonwealth Arts Festival	Two (6s, 1s 6d) Also issued in Phosphor set.	David Gentleman
13 September 1965	25th Anniversary of Battle of Britain	Eight (6 different stamps at 4d, 9d, 1s 3d) Also issued in Phosphor set.	David Gentleman and Rosalind Dease
8 October 1965	Post Office Tower	Two (3d, 1s 3d) Also issued in Phosphor set.	Clive Abbott
25 October 1965	20th Anniversary of UNO and International Co-operation Year	Two (3d, 1s 6d) Also issued in Phosphor set.	
15 November 1965	ITU Centenary	Two (9d, 1s 6d) Also issued in Phosphor set.	
1966
25 January 1966	Burns Commemoration	Two (4d, 1s 3d) Also issued in Phosphor set.	Gordon F. Huntley
28 February 1966	900th Anniversary of Westminster Abbey	Two (3d, 2s 6d) One (3d) also issued in Phosphor.	Sheila Robinson
2 May 1966	Landscapes	Four (4d, 6d, 1s 3d, 1s 6d) Also issued in Phosphor set.	Leonard Rosoman
1 June 1966	World Cup Football Championship	Three (4d, 6d, 1s 3d) Also issued in Phosphor set.	
8 August 1966	British Birds	Four (Four different 4d) Also issued in Phosphor set.	J Norris Wood
18 August 1966	England's World Cup Football Victory {4d value from the June set, with 'England Winners' added to design}	One (4d)	David Gentleman
19 September 1966	British Technology	Four (4d, 6d, 1s 3d, 1s 6d) Also issued in Phosphor set.	D Gillespie
14 October 1966	900th Anniversary of Battle of Hastings	Eight (Six different 4d, 6d, 1s 3d) Also issued in Phosphor set.	David Gentleman
1 December 1966	Christmas	Two (3d, 1s 6d) Also issued in Phosphor set.	Tasveer Shemza and James Berry. Shemza and Berry were six-year-old children whose stamp designs won a Blue Peter competition. Shemza was the daughter of the artist Anwar Shemza.
1967
20 February 1967	European Free Trade Association (EFTA)	Two (Both with Watermark)	
24 April 1967	British Wild Flowers	Six (All with Watermark)	Mary Grierson (Two); W. Keble Martin (Four)
10 July 1967	British Paintings	Three (No watermark)	
24 July 1967	Sir Francis Chichester's World Voyage	One (No watermark)	
19 September 1967	British Discovery and Invention	Four (All with Watermark)	
18 October 1967	Christmas (4d value)	One (No watermark)	
27 November 1967	Christmas (3d & 1s 6d values)	Two (No watermark)	
1968
29 April 1968	British Bridges	Four	
29 May 1968	British Anniversaries	Four	David Gentleman
12 August 1968	British Paintings	Four	
25 November 1968	Christmas	Three	
1969
15 January 1969	British Ships	Six (5d, 3 × 9d se-tenant, 2 × 1s se-tenant)	David Gentleman
3 March 1969	First flight of Concorde	Three (4d, 9d, 1s 6d)	Michael Goaman & David Gentleman
2 April 1969	Anniversaries	Five	
28 May 1969	British Architecture, Cathedrals	Six	
1 July 1969	Investiture of HRH The Prince of Wales	Five	
13 August 1969	Gandhi Centenary Year	One	
1 October 1969	Post Office Technology Commemoration	Four	David Gentleman
26 November 1969	Christmas	Three	

== Other decades ==
From 1965 onwards, in most years, there were between six and ten sets issued every year. The listings for the years after 1969 are set out in decades.

- United Kingdom commemorative stamps 1970–1979
- United Kingdom commemorative stamps 1980–1989
- United Kingdom commemorative stamps 1990–1999
- United Kingdom commemorative stamps 2000–2009
- United Kingdom commemorative stamps 2010–2019
- United Kingdom commemorative stamps 2020–2029

== See also ==
- Stamp collecting
- List of people on stamps
- Philately
- PHQ card

== References and sources ==
Notes

Sources

- Stanley Gibbons Great Britain Concise Stamp Catalogue
- Gibbons Stamp Monthly
- Royal Mail Stamp Guide
- Royal Mail British Philatelic Bulletin
