= United Kingdom commemorative stamps 2020–2029 =

This is a list of the commemorative stamps of the United Kingdom for the years 2020–2029.

== List ==
=== 2020 ===
Issue number	Issue date	Issue title	Details of stamps in issue	Designer(s)
2020
581	2020-01-21	Video games	8 stamps: 2nd class ×2: Elite (1984) BBC Micro and Acorn Electron, Worms (1995) Commodore Amiga; 1st class ×2: Lemmings (1991) Commodore Amiga, Sensible Soccer (1992) Commodore Amiga; £1.55 ×2: Micro Machines (1991) Sega Mega Drive, Wipeout (1995) Sony PlayStation; £1.60 ×2: Dizzy (1987) ZX Spectrum, Populous (1989) Commodore Amiga; Miniature Sheet 4 stamps: 1st class ×2: Atlantean Scion / Tomb Raider (1996), Ceremonial Dagger / Tomb Raider (2013); £1.55 ×2: Ora Dagger / Tomb Raider III – Adventures of Lara Croft (1998), Philosopher's Stone / Tomb Raider Chronicles (2000).	Supple Studio & Bitmap Books
582	2020-02-11	Visions of the Universe	8 stamps: 2nd class ×2: Cat's Eye Nebula, Enceladus; 1st class ×2: Pulsar, Black Hole; £1.55 ×2: Jupiter's Aurora, Gravitational Lensing; £1.60 ×2: Comet 67P/Churyumov-Gerasimenko, Cygnus A Galaxy;	True North
583	2020-03-17	James Bond	6 stamps: 1st class ×3: Timothy Dalton in The Living Daylights (1987), Pierce Brosnan in GoldenEye (1995), Daniel Craig in Casino Royale (2006). £1.60 ×3: Sean Connery in Goldfinger (1964), George Lazenby in On Her Majesty's Secret Service (1969) and Roger Moore in Live and Let Die (1973). Miniature Sheet 4 stamps: 1st class ×2: Bell-Textron Jet pack in Thunderball, Aston Martin DB5 from Skyfall. £1.55 ×2: Little Nellie the autogyro featured in You Only Live Twice, Lotus Esprit submarine from The Spy Who Loved Me.	Interabang
–	2020-04-06	Declaration of Arbroath	Miniature Sheet 4 stamps: 2nd class ×1: The Saltire; 1st class ×1: Lion Rampant of Scotland; £1.42 ×1: Thistle; £1.63 ×1: Tartan	Tayburn
584	2020-04-07	The Romantic Poets	10 stamps: 1st class ×10: John Clare, Samuel Taylor Coleridge, William Blake, Walter Scott, Percy Bysshe Shelley, William Wordsworth, Mary Robinson, Letitia Elizabeth Landon, John Keats, Lord Byron (issued to mark the 250th anniversary of the birth of Wordsworth).	The Chase
585	2020-05-08	End of the Second World War	8 stamps: 1st class ×2: Jubilant public, 1945, Evacuees return home, 1945, 2nd class ×2: Serviceman welcomed home, 1945, Nurses celebrate, 1945, £1.42 ×2: Troops parade at end of war, 1945, Demobilised servicemen, 1945, £1.63 ×2: Allied POWs liberated, 1945 and Navy personnel celebrate, 1945. Miniature Sheet: 4 stamps: 1st class ×2: Hall of names, Runnymede Memorial, £1.63 ×2: Plymouth Naval Memorial, Rangoon Memorial, Myanmar.	hat-trick design
586	2020-05-28	Coronation Street	8 stamps: 2nd class ×2: Ena Sharples and Elsie Tanner, Stan and Hilda Ogden; 1st class ×2: Vera and Jack Duckworth, Deirdre and Ken Barlow; 2 ×£1.42: Rita Sullivan and Norris Cole, Hayley and Roy Cropper; £1.63 ×2: Sunita and Dev Alahan, Tracy Barlow and Steve McDonald; Miniature Sheet: 4 stamps: 1st class ×2: Bet Lynch, Raquel Watts; 2 ×£1.42: Liz McDonald, Gemma Winter	The Chase
587	2020-06-18	Roman Britain	8 stamps: 2nd class ×2: Dover Lighthouse; Bignor Mosaic; 1st class ×2: Amffitheatr yng Nghaer Isca – Caerllion Amphitheatre at Isca Fortress, Ribchester Helmet, £1.63 ×2: Bridgeness distance slab, Warrior god – Cambridgeshire; £1.68 ×2: Gorgon's head – Bath, Hadrian's Wall;	Up
588	2020-07-09	Music Giants: Queen	8 stamps: 1st class ×4: Queen II, Sheer Heart Attack, A Night at the Opera, News of the World, £1.63 ×4: The Game, Greatest Hits, The Works and Innuendo. Miniature Sheet: 5 stamps: 1st class ×3: Queen 1974, Magic Tour, 1986, Hyde Park Concert, 1976, £1.63 ×2: A Night at the Opera Tour, 1975 and Magic Tour, 1986.	Royal Mail Group Ltd.
589	2020-07-30	The Palace of Westminster	6 stamps: 1st class ×3: View from Old Palace Yard, River Thames view, Elizabeth Tower; £1.68 ×3: Commons Chamber, Central Lobby, Lords Chamber; Miniature Sheet: 1st class ×2: Norman Porch, Chapel of St Mary Undercroft; £1.63 ×2: St Stephen's Hall, Royal Gallery;	Steers McGillan Eves
590	2020-08-18	Sherlock	6 stamps: 1st class ×2: The Reichenbach Fall, A Study in Pink; £1.42 ×2: The Great Game, The Empty Hearse; £1.68 ×2: A Scandal in Belgravia, The Final Problem (featuring characters played by Benedict Cumberbatch (Sherlock Holmes), Martin Freeman (Watson) and two other characters). Miniature Sheet: 1st class ×2: The Adventure of the Speckled Band, The Red-Headed League; £1.68 ×2: The Adventure of the Second Stain, The Adventure of the Dancing Man.	6/S: So Design Consultants – M/S: NB Studio
591	2020-09-03	Rupert Bear	8 stamps: 2nd class ×2: Rupert's Rainy Adventure; 1st class ×2: Rupert and the Mare's Nest; £1.45 ×2: Rupert and the Lost Cuckoo; £1.70 ×2: Rupert's Christmas Tree;	Rose
592	2020-10-01	Brilliant Bugs	6 stamps: 2 ×1st class: Common carder bee (Bombus pascuorum), Marmalade hoverfly (Episyrphus balteatus); 2 ×£1.45: Longhorn beetle (Rutpela maculata), Elephant hawk-moth (Deilephila elpenor); 2 ×£1.70: Painted lady butterfly (Vanessa cardui); Ruby-tailed wasp (Chrysis ignita agg.);	Royal Mail Group Ltd.
593	2020-11-03	Christmas	8 Stamps: • 2nd class and 2nd class large: St Andrew's Church, Lexham Road, East Lexham, PE32 2QL – east window (c.1859); • 1st class and 1st class large: St Andrew's Church, Coln Rogers, Cheltenham, GL54 3LB – east window (c.1865); • £1.45 stamp: Church of St James, Church Hill, Hollowell, Northampton, NN6 8RR – chancel apse southeast window (1863); • £1.70 stamp: All Saints’ Church, Kirkgate, Otley, LS21 3HW – south transept window (1862); • £2.50 stamp: St Columba's Church, Church Street, Topcliffe, Thirsk, YO7 3PA – chancel south window (c.1860); • £2.55 Stamp: Christ Church, 30 London Rd, Coalville, LE67 3JA – chancel north window (1976).	Royal Mail Group and Up
594	2020-11-13	Star Trek	12 stamps: 12 ×1st class: James T Kirk, Jean-Luc Picard, Benjamin Sisko, Kathryn Janeway, Jonathan Archer, Gabriel Lorca, Spock, Deanna Troi, Julian Bashir, Malcom Reid, Michael Burnam, Ash Tyler; Minitaure Sheet: 6 stamps: 6 ×1st class: Montgomery Scott, Shinzon, Tolian Soran, Klingon Chancellor Gorkon, Carol Marcus, Krall	Interabang

=== 2021 ===
Issue number	Issue date	Issue title	Details of stamps in issue	Designer(s)
2021
596	2021-01-14	National Parks	10 stamps: 1st class ×10: Peak District, Lake District, Snowdonia, Dartmoor, North York Moors, The Broads, New Forest, South Downs, Pembrokeshire Coast, Loch Lomond and the Trossachs	Studio Mean
M26	2021-01-26	United Kingdom: A Celebration	4 stamps: 1st class ×2: Great Sport, Great Creativity. £1.70 ×2: Great Community, Great Industry and Innovation.	hat-trick design
597	2021-02-16	Only Fools and Horses	8 stamps: 1st class ×4: A Losing Streak, Sleeping Dogs Lie, Yuppy Love, A Touch of Glass. £1.70 ×4: The Jolly Boys' Outing, The Unlucky Winner Is..., Three Men, a Woman and a Baby, Time on Our Hands. Miniature Sheet: 4 stamps with catchphrases: 1st class ×2: Del Boy, Rodney. £1.70 ×2: Grandad, Uncle Albert	Interabang
598	2021-03-16	The Legend of King Arthur	10 stamps: 1st class ×5: Merlin and the baby Arthur, Arthur draws the sword from the stone, Arthur takes Excalibur, Arthur marries Guinevere, Sir Gawain and the Green Knight. £1.70 ×5: Knights of the Round Table, Sir Lancelot defeats the dragon, Sir Galahad and the Holy Grail, Arthur and Mordred's final battle, The death of King Arthur	Godfrey Design
599	2021-04-15	Classic science fiction by British writers	6 stamps: 1st class ×2: Frankenstein by Mary Shelley, The Time Machine by H. G. Wells. £1.70 ×2: Brave New World by Aldous Huxley, The Day of the Triffids by John Wyndham. £2.55 ×2: Childhood's End by Arthur C. Clarke, Shikasta by Doris Lessing.	Webb & Webb Design Limited
600	2021-05-04	The Wars of the Roses	8 stamps: 2nd class ×2: Battle of Bosworth, 1485, Battle of Tewkesbury, 1471. 1st class ×2: Battle of Barnet, 1471, Battle of Edgecote Moor, 1469. £1.70 ×2: Battle of Towton, 1461, Battle of Wakefield, 1460. £2.55 ×2: Battle of Northampton, 1460, First Battle of St Albans, 1455.	Royal Mail Group Ltd.
601	2021-05-28	Paul McCartney	8 stamps: 1st class ×4: McCartney (1970), Ram (1971), Venus and Mars (Wings, 1975), McCartney II (1980). £1.70 ×4: Tug of War (1982), Flaming Pie (1997), Egypt Station (2018), McCartney III (2020) Miniature sheet: 4 stamps: Paul McCartney in the Studio: 1st class ×2: McCartney, 1970, Ram, 1971. £1.70 ×2: McCartney II, 1980, Flaming Pie, 1997.	Baxter & Bailey
602	2021-06-24	In Memoriam, HRH The Prince Philip, Duke of Edinburgh	4 stamps: 2nd class ×1: HRH The Prince Philip, Duke of Edinburgh taken by the photographer Baron. 1st class ×1: HRH The Prince Philip, Duke of Edinburgh attending the passing out parade of Prince Andrew at Dartmouth Naval College, Devon. £1.70 ×1: HRH The Prince Philip, Duke of Edinburgh at the Royal Windsor Horse Show. £2.55 ×1: HRH The Prince Philip, Duke of Edinburgh taken by the photographer Terry O’Neill.	Kate Stephens and Royal Mail Group Ltd.
603	2021-07-01	Dennis the Menace and Gnasher	6 stamps: 1st class ×3: Dennis's first comic strip (1951), Dennis adopts Gnasher (1968), Dennis's front cover debut (1974). £1.70 ×3: Dennis adopts Rasher the Pig (1979), Dennis meets his sister Bea (1998), Dennis reveals dad was Dennis (2015). Miniature sheet: 4 stamps: 1st class ×2: Dennis, Gnasher, £1.70 ×2: Minnie the Minx, Family Portrait.	The Chase
604	2021-07-22	Wild Coasts	10 stamps: 1st class ×10: northern gannet, common cuttlefish, grey seal, bottlenose dolphin, spiny spider crab, long-snouted seahorse, orca, fried-egg anemone, cuckoo wrasse, cold-water coral reef. Miniature sheet: 4 stamps: marine food chain – 1st class ×2: phytoplankton, zooplankton, £1.70 ×2: Atlantic herring and harbour porpoise.	Steers McGillan Eves
605	2021-08-12	Industrial Revolutions		Common Curiosity
606	2021-09-02	British Army Vehicles		Royal Mail Group Ltd.
607	2021-09-17	DC Collection	12 stamps: 1st class ×12: Batman, Batwoman, Robin, Batgirl, Alfred, Nightwing, The Joker, Harley Quinn, The Penguin, Poison Ivy, Catwoman, The Riddler. Miniature sheet: 1st class ×6: Batman, Green Lantern and The Flash, Wonder Woman, Superman, Cyborg and Aquaman and Supergirl and Shazam!.	Interbang
608	2021-10-19	Rugby Union		True North
609	2021-11-02	Christmas 2021		Supple Studio

=== 2022 ===
Issue number	Issue date	Issue title	Details of stamps in issue	Designer(s)
2022
611	2022-01-20	Music Giants VI – The Rolling Stones	8 stamps: 1st class ×4: London, UK, East Rutherford, New Jersey, USA 2019, Rotterdam, Netherlands 1995, Tokyo, Japan 1995, £1.70 ×4: New York City, USA 1972, Oslo, Norway 2014, Hertfordshire, UK 1976 Düsseldorf, Germany 2017. Miniature sheet: 1st class ×2: The Rolling Stones, £1.70 ×2: Posters: Urban Jungle and Tour of the Americas, Posters: UK Tour 1971 and American Tour 1981.	Baxter & Bailey
612	2022-02-04	Her Majesty The Queen's Platinum Jubilee	8 stamps: 1st class ×4: February 2020, London, October 1957, Washington, April 1980, Worcester, June 1978, London. £1.70 ×4: May 2005, Alberta, June 1977, Camberwell, February 1966, St Vincent and June 1999, Windsor.	Kate Stephens
613	2022-02-18	The Stamp Designs of David Gentleman		Hat-trick Design
614	2022-03-08	The FA Cup		The Chase
615	2022-03-23	Heroes of the COVID-19 Pandemic		Royal Mail Group Ltd and Studio Up
616	2022-04-07	Migratory Birds		Hat-trick Design
617	2022-05-05	Unsung Heroes: Women of World War II		Supple Studio
618	2022-06-09	Cats	8 stamps: 2nd class ×2: Siamese, Tabby. 1st class ×2: Ginger cat, British Shorthair. £1.85 ×2: Maine Coon, black and white. £2.55 ×2: Bengal and tabby and white cat.	Studio Up
619	2022-07-01	Pride		NB Studio
620	2022-07-28	Birmingham 2022 Commonwealth Games		Interabang
621	2022-09-01	Transformers		The Chase
622	2022-09-29	Royal Marines		Osborne Ross and Studio Up
623	2022-10-19	Aardman Classics		Studio Up and Royal Mail Group Ltd
624	2022-11-03	Christmas	6 stamps: 2nd class, 2nd class large, 1st class, 1st class large, £1.85, £2.55	
625	2022-11-10	In Memoriam: Her Majesty The Queen	4 stamps: 2nd class, 1st class, £1.85, £2.55	
626	2022-11-24	Tutankhamun		

=== 2023 ===
Issue number	Issue date	Issue title	Details of stamps in issue	Designer(s)
2023
627	2023-01-12	Music Giants VII: Iron Maiden	8 stamps: bassist Steve Harris, singer Bruce Dickinson, the guitarists (Dave Murray, Adrian Smith and Janick Gers), drummer Nicko McBrain, Dickinson with Murray and Gers, Eddie from "The Trooper", Eddie from "Aces High", and Dickinson fighting a walk-on Eddie on stage.	Royal Mail Group Ltd
629	2023-02-16	X-Men		Interbang
628	2023-03-09	The Flying Scotsman		Steers McGillan Eves
630	2022-03-23	Flowers	The first UK commemorative stamp issue to include the head of the new monarch, Charles III	Charlie Smith Design
631	2023-04-13	The Legend of Robin Hood	10 stamps: 1st class ×10	Godfrey Design Illustration, from illustrations by Jon McCoy
632	2023-05-06	His Majesty King Charles III: A New Reign		Atelier Works
633	2023-05-17	Blackadder		True North
634	2023-06-08	Warhammer		Common Curiosity
635	2023-06-22	Windrush: 75 Years	8 stamps: 1st class X2, £1.00 ×2, £2.00 ×2, and £2.20 ×2	The Chase and Supple Studio
636	2023-07-13	River Wildlife	10 stamps: 2nd class ×5, 1st class ×5	Studio Up
637	2023-08-10	Terry Pratchett's Discworld		So design consultants
638	2023-09-05	Paddington		Together Design
639	2023-09-21	Music Giants VIII: Dame Shirley Bassey		Royal Mail Group Limited
640	2023-10-19	Harry Potter		True North
641	2023-11-02	Christmas 2023		Steers McGillan Eves

=== 2024 ===
Issue number	Issue date	Issue title	Details of stamps in issue	Designer(s)
2024
643	2024-01-11	Music Giants IX: Spice Girls	10 stamps: 1st class × 10: Spice Girls at BRIT Awards 1997, Melanie Chisholm at BRIT Awards 1998, Spice Girls at the Olympic Ceremony 2012, Geri Halliwell at the BRIT Awards 1997, Spice Girls, San Jose 2007. Emma Bunton, Wembley Arena in 1998, Spice Girls in Istanbul 1997, Victoria Beckham in New York, 2008, Spice Girls in Dublin, 1998, Melanie Brown, BRIT Awards 1997. Miniature sheet: 1st class × 5: Posh Spice, Scary Spice, Baby Spice, Ginger Spice and Sporty Spice.	Supple Studio
644	2024-02-01	Weather forecasting		Hat-trick design
645	2024-02-20	Viking Britain		Studio Up
646	2024-03-12	The Age of the Dinosaurs	1st Class X 4: Tyrannosaurus, Triceratops, Coloborhynchus, Iguanodon; £2.00 X 4: Stegosaurus, Diplodocus, Megalosaurus, Cryptoclidus; Miniature sheet: 1st Class X 4: One of the 19th century’s greatest fossil hunters Mary Anning, Ichthyosaurus communis, Dapedium politum, Plesiosaurus macrocephalus	The Chase
647	2024-04-16	100 Years of Commemorative Stamps	10 stamps: 1st class × 10: British Empire Exhibition, Postal Union Congress, Silver Jubilee. Royal Silver Wedding, Centenary of First Adhesive Postage Stamps, Peace and Reconstruction. Tercentenary of ‘General Letter Office’, Coronation of Queen Elizabeth II, Festival of Britain. Landscapes, Investiture of HRH The Prince of Wales, National Nature Week. Philympia 70 Stamp Exhibition, British Wildlife, British Achievement in Chemistry. Flowers, Halley’s Comet, Transport and Communication. Robert Burns: The Immortal Memory, Millennium, Architects of the Air. The Weather, Lest We Forget, Sounds of Britain. Landmark Buildings, Jane Austen, Queen. Platinum Jubilee, Brilliant Bugs, Windrush:75 Years.	Hat-trick Design
648	2024-05-16	Peppa Pig		Michael OShea
649	2024-06-06	Dogs		Royal Mail Group Ltd
650	2024-06-20	Red Arrows: 60 Seasons		Interbang
651	2024-07-25	Dungeons & Dragons		Common Curiosity and Royal Mail Group Ltd
652	2024-08-13	Tower of London		Studio Up
653	2024-09-03	Porridge		Steers McGillan Eves
654	2024-09-26	Spiders		Royal Mail Group Ltd
655	2024-10-17	The Who		Royal Mail Group Ltd
656	2024-11-05	Christmas 2024		Together Design London Limited
657	2024-11-30	Sir Winston Churchill		Baxter & Bailey

=== 2025 ===
Issue number	Issue date	Issue title	Details of stamps in issue	Designer(s)
2025
659	2025-01-14	The Vicar of Dibley	stamps: class × 1:	True North
660	2025-01-30	Royal Armouries	stamps: class × 1:	Charlie Smith Design
661	2025-02-18	AC/DC	8 stamps: 1st class × 4: London, UK, 1976, Melbourne, Australia, 2015, Chicago, USA, 1979, Indio, California, USA, 2023, £2 × 4: London, UK, 1990, London, UK, 1986, London, UK, 2009, Boston 1978.	Royal Mail Group Ltd
662	2025-03-11	Garden Wildlife	10 stamps: 2nd class × 5, 1st class × 5:	Stop, Look and Listen
663	2025-03-27	Myths and Legends	8 stamps: All 1st class	Godfrey Design
664	2025-05-01	Valour and Victory: Stories of the Second World War	14 stamps: All 1st class × 10 Miniature sheet: 1st class × 4 of Dame Vera Lynn	Supple Studio
665	2025-05-22	The Chronicles of Narnia	12 stamps:	Sipple Studio
666	2025-06-12	Royal Observatory Greenwich	10 stamps: 1st class × 6 Miniature sheet: 1st class × 4	Steers McGillan Eves
667	2025-07-03	Mushrooms	10 stamps: 2nd class × 5 and 1st class × 5	Royal Mail Group Ltd
668	2025-07-24	Peanuts	8 stamps: 1st class × 8	Interabang
669	2025-08-14	Monty Python	10 stamps: 1st class × 6, Miniature sheet: 1st class × 4	Common Curiosity
670	2025-09-11	Ducks	8 stamps:	
671	2025-09-25	Steam Locomotives	8 stamps:	
672	2025-10-16	Monopoly	8 stamps:	
673	2025-11-04	Christmas 2025	8 stamps:	
674	2025-11-27	The Stamps of Queen Victoria	8 stamps:	

=== 2026 ===
Issue number	Issue date	Issue title	Details of stamps in issue	Designer(s)
2026
676	2026-01-13	Stranger Things	1st class × 14:	Interabang
677	2026-01-21	Concorde	1st class × 12:	Common Curiosity
678	2026-02-19	Hornby Model Railways	1st class × 12:	The Chase
680	2026-02-26	Roses	2nd class × 5 1st class × 5:	Charlie Smith Design
679	2026-03-20	The Lord of the Rings	1st class × 8: 1st class × 4 (miniature sheet):	True North
681	2026-04-21	Centenary of the Birth of Queen Elizabeth II	1st class × 12:	Baxter & Bailey
682	2026-05-21	Castles	1st class x 8: 1st class x 4 (miniature sheet):	Robert Ball
683	2026-06-23	Waterfalls	1st class x 5: 2nd class x 5:	Studio Mean
684	2026-07-09	Moths	1st class x 5: 2nd class x 5:	Richard Lewington
685	2026-07-30	Military Jet Aircraft	1st class x 8: 1st class x 4 (miniature sheet):	Webb & Webb Design Ltd
686	2026-08-20	Pets	1st class x 5: 2nd class x 5:	Royal Mail Group Ltd
687	2026-09-17	Duran Duran	1st class x 8: 1st class x 4 (miniature sheet):	Royal Mail Group Ltd
688	2026-10-14	Winnie-the-Pooh	1st class x 6: 1st class x 4 (miniature sheet):	Supple Studio
689	2026-11-03	Christmas 2026	5 stamps 1 miniature sheet	Hat-trick Designs
690	2026-11-11	Remembrance	1st class x 6:	Baxter & Bailey Matthew Cook
691	2026-12-01	Football (Season One)	TBC	TBC

== Other periods ==
- United Kingdom commemorative stamps 1924–1969
- United Kingdom commemorative stamps 1970–1979
- United Kingdom commemorative stamps 1980–1989
- United Kingdom commemorative stamps 1990–1999
- United Kingdom commemorative stamps 2000–2009
- United Kingdom commemorative stamps 2010–2019

== See also ==
- Stanley Gibbons
- Stamp collecting
- List of people on stamps
- Philately
- Stamps
- PHQ Cards
- The WikiBooks Worldwide Stamp Catalogue
