= United Kingdom commemorative stamps 1970–1979 =

The United Kingdom, known in philatelic circles as "Great Britain", released many commemorative stamps (postage stamps issued to honour or commemorate a place, event or person) in the 1970s.

== History ==
The first adhesive postage stamp, the Penny Black, was introduced in the UK on 6 May 1840. Until 1924, all British stamps only showed the reigning monarch's portrait, except for the 1913 "Sea Horses" design. The first commemorative stamp was issued in 1924 for the British Empire Exhibition, and since the mid-1960s, six to nine sets of commemorative stamps are released each year. PHQ cards, postcard-sized reproductions of commemorative stamps, have also been issued since the mid-1970s.

British commemorative stamps issued between 1970 and 1979
Issue date	Issue details	Stamps in set	Designer(s)
1970
11 February 1970	British Rural Architecture	Four	David Gentleman
1 April 1970	Anniversaries	Five	
3 June 1970	Literary anniversaries	Five	Rosalind Dease
15 July 1970	Ninth British Commonwealth Games	Three	
18 September 1970	"Philympia 70" Stamp Exhibition	Three	David Gentleman
25 November 1970	Christmas	Three	
1971
16 June 1971	"Ulster 1971" Paintings (first decimal commemoratives)	Three	Stuart Rose
28 July 1971	Literary Anniversaries	Three	
25 August 1971	British Anniversaries	Three	
22 September 1971	British Architecture	Four	
13 October 1971	Christmas	Three	
1972
16 February 1972	British Polar Explorers	Four	P.B. Powell
26 April 1972	General Anniversaries	Three	
21 June 1972	British Architecture, Village Churches	Five	
13 September 1972	Broadcasting Anniversaries	Four	David Gentleman
18 October 1972	Christmas	Three	
20 November 1972	Royal Silver Wedding	Two	
1973
3 January 1973	Britain's entry into the European Communities	Three	
28 February 1973	Plant A Tree Year	One	
18 April 1973	British Explorers	Five	
16 May 1973	County Cricket 1873–1973	Three	Edward M Ripley
4 July 1973	British Paintings	Four	
15 August 1973	400th Anniversary of the Birth of Inigo Jones	Four	
12 September 1973	Commonwealth Parliamentary Conference	Two	
14 November 1973	Royal Wedding	Two	
28 November 1973	Christmas	Six	David Gentleman
1974
27 February 1974	British Trees	One	David Gentleman
24 April 1974	Bicentenary of Fire Prevention Act	Four	David Gentleman
12 June 1974	Centenary of Universal Postal Union	Four	Rosalind Dease
10 July 1974	Medieval Warriors	Four	
9 October 1974	Birth Centenary of Sir Winston Churchill	Four	
27 November 1974	Christmas	Four	
1975
22 January 1975	Health & Handicap Funds	One	Philip Sharland
19 February 1975	Birth Bicentenary of J. M. W. Turner	Four	
23 April 1975	European Architectural Heritage Year	Five	
11 June 1975	Sailing	Four	
13 August 1975	150th Anniversary of the first Steam Train	Four	
3 September 1975	62nd Inter-Parliamentary Union Conference	One	
22 October 1975	Birth Bicentenary of Jane Austen	Four	
26 November 1975	Christmas	Four	
1976
10 March 1976	Telephone Centenary	Four (8 1/2p,10p,11p,13p)	
28 April 1976	Social Reformers	Four (8 1/2p,10p,11p,13p)	David Gentleman
2 June 1976	Bicentennial of American Independence 1776–1976	One (11p)	Philip Sharland
30 June 1976	Centenary of National Rose Society	Four (8 1/2p,10p,11p,13p)	
4 August 1976	British Cultural Traditions	Four (8 1/2p,10p,11p,13p)	
29 September 1976	500th Anniversary of British Printing	Four (8 1/2p,10p,11p,13p)	
24 November 1976	Christmas	Four (6 1/2p, 8 1/2p, 11p,13p)	
1977
12 January 1977	Racket Sports	Four (8 1/2p,10p,11p,13p)	
2 March 1977	Royal Institute of Chemistry Centenary	Four (8 1/2p,10p,11p,13p)	
11 May 1977	Silver Jubilee (8 1/2p-10p-11p-13p values)	Four {full set = 5}	
8 June 1977	Commonwealth Heads of Government Meeting, London	One (13p)	Peter Murdoch
15 June 1977	Silver Jubilee (9p value)	One {full set = 5}	
5 October 1977	British Wildlife	Five (5 x 9p)	
23 November 1977	Christmas	Six (5 x 7p, 9p)	David Gentleman
1978
25 January 1978	Energy Resources	Four (9p, 10p, 11p, 13p)	
1 March 1978	British Architecture	Four + Miniature sheet (9p, 10p, 11p, 13p)	Stamps: Ronald Maddox; Mini-sheet: Jeffery Matthews
31 May 1978	25th Anniversary of the Coronation	Four	
5 July 1978	Horses	Four	Patrick Oxenham
2 August 1978	Centenaries of Cyclists' Touring Club and British Cycling Federation	Four	Fritz Wegner
22 November 1978	Christmas	Four	Faith Jacques
1979
7 February 1979	Dogs	Four	
21 March 1979	Spring Wild Flowers	Four	Peter Newcombe
9 May 1979	First direct elections to European Assembly	Four	
6 June 1979	Horse Racing paintings	Four	
11 July 1979	International Year of the Child	Four	
22 August 1979	Death Centenary of Sir Roland Hill	Four	
26 September 1979	150th Anniversary of Metropolitan Police	Four	
24 October 1979	Death Centenary of Sir Roland Hill	Miniature sheet	
21 November 1979	Christmas	Five	Fritz Wegner

== Other decades ==
- United Kingdom commemorative stamps 1924–1969
- United Kingdom commemorative stamps 1980–1989
- United Kingdom commemorative stamps 1990–1999
- United Kingdom commemorative stamps 2000–2009
- United Kingdom commemorative stamps 2010–2019
- United Kingdom commemorative stamps 2020–2029

== Acknowledgments ==
- Stanley Gibbons
- Concise Stamp Catalogue
- Gibbons Stamp Monthly
- Royal Mail Stamp Guide
- Royal Mail British Philatelic Bulletin

== See also ==
- Stanley Gibbons
- Stamp Collecting
- List of people on stamps
- Philately
- stamps
- PHQ Cards
