= United Kingdom commemorative stamps 1980–1989 =

The United Kingdom, known in philatelic circles as Great Britain, released many commemorative stamps (postage stamps issued to honour or commemorate a place, event or person) in the 1980s.

== History ==
Postage stamps were first issued in the United Kingdom on 6 May 1840, with the introduction of the world's first adhesive postage stamp, known as the Penny Black. Until 1924, all British stamps depicted only the portrait of the reigning monarch, with the exception of the "high value" stamps (also known as the "Sea Horses" design) issued in 1913, which were twice the size of normal stamps with added pictorial design.

In 1924, the first "commemorative" stamp was issued for the British Empire Exhibition. There were then occasional issues over the next thirty years, when the frequency of new issues became more regular. From the mid-1960s, in most years, six to nine sets of commemorative stamps have been issued every year. PHQ cards, postcard-sized reproductions of commemorative stamps, have also been issued to accompany every new set of stamps since the mid-1970s.

British commemorative stamps issued between 1980 and 1989
Issue date	Issue details	Stamps in set	Designer(s)
1980
16 January 1980	Centenary of Wild Bird Protection Act	Four (10p, 11 1/2p, 13p, 15p)	Michael Warren
12 March 1980	150th Anniversary of Liverpool & Manchester Railway	Five (5 × 12p se-tenant)	David Gentleman
9 April 1980	"London 1980" International Stamp Exhibition	One (50p)	Jeffery Matthews
7 May 1980	"London 1980" International Stamp Exhibition (Miniature Sheet)	One (Minisheet 50p. Was sold for 75p, the premium being used for the exhibition)	Jeffery Matthews
7 May 1980	London Landmarks	Five (10 1/2p, 12p, 13 1/2p, 15p, 17 1/2p)	Sir Hugh Casson
9 July 1980	Famous Authoresses	Four (12p, 13 1/2p, 15p, 17 1/2p)	Barbara Brown
4 August 1980	80th Birthday of Queen Elizabeth The Queen Mother	One (12p)	Jeffery Matthews
10 September 1980	British Conductors	Four (12p, 13 1/2p, 15p, 17 1/2p)	Peter Gauld
10 October 1980	Sport Centenaries	Four (12p, 13 1/2p, 15p, 17 1/2p)	Robert Goldsmith
19 November 1980	Christmas	Five (10p, 12p, 13 1/2p, 15p, 17 1/2p)	Jeffery Matthews
1981
6 February 1981	Folklore	Four	Fritz Wegner
25 March 1981	International Year of the Disabled	Four	John Gibbs
13 May 1981	Butterflies	Four	Gordon Beningfield
24 June 1981	50th Anniversary of the National Trust for Scotland	Five	M Fairclough
22 July 1981	Royal Wedding	Two	David Gentleman using photos taken by Lord Snowdon
12 August 1981	25th Anniversary of Duke of Edinburgh Award Scheme	Four	P. Sharland
23 September 1981	Fishing Industry	Four	B. Sanders
18 November 1981	Christmas	Five	
1982
10 February 1982	Death Centenary of Charles Darwin	Four	David Gentleman
24 March 1982	Youth Organisations	Four	
28 April 1982	Europa – British Theatre	Four	
16 June 1982	Maritime Heritage	Five	Marjorie Saynor
23 July 1982	British Textiles	Four	
8 September 1982	Information Technology	Two	
13 October 1982	British Motor Cars	Four	
17 November 1982	Christmas	Five	
1983
26 January 1983	British River Fishes	Four	
9 March 1983	Commonwealth Day, Geographical Regions	Four	
25 May 1983	Europa – Engineering Achievements	Three	
6 July 1983	British Army Uniforms	Five	
24 August 1983	British Gardens	Four	
5 October 1983	British Fairs	Four	
16 November 1983	Christmas	Five	
1984
17 January 1984	500th Anniversary of College of Arms	Four	
6 March 1984	British Cattle	Five	
10 April 1984	Urban Renewal	Four	
15 May 1984	25th Anniversary of C.E.P.T. ('Europa') & second elections to European Parliament	Four	
5 June 1984	London Economic Summit Conference	One	
26 June 1984	Centenary of Greenwich Meridian	Four	
31 July 1984	Bicentenary of First Mail Coach Run, Bath and Bristol to London	Five	
25 September 1984	50th Anniversary of the British Council	Four	
20 November 1984	Christmas	Five	
1985
22 January 1985	Famous Trains	Five	
12 March 1985	Insects	Five	
14 May 1985	Europa, European Music Year, British Composers	Four	
18 June 1985	Safety at Sea	Four	
30 July 1985	350 years of Royal Mail Public Postal Service	Four	
3 September 1985	Arthurian Legends	Four	
8 October 1985	British Film Year	Five (Sir Alfred Hitchcock, Sir Charlie Chaplin, Vivien Leigh, Peter Sellers and David Niven).	
19 November 1985	Christmas	Five	
1986
14 January 1986	Industry Year	Four	
18 February 1986	Appearance of Halley's Comet	Four	
21 April 1986	60th Birthday of Queen Elizabeth II	Four	
20 May 1986	Europa, Nature Conservation-Endangered Species	Four	
17 June 1986	900th Anniversary of Domesday Book	Four	
15 July 1986	13th Commonwealth Games, Edinburgh & World Hockey Cup for Men, London	Five	
22 July 1986	Royal Wedding	Two	
19 August 1986	32nd Commonwealth Parliamentary Association Conference	One	
16 September 1986	History of the Royal Air Force	Five	
18 November 1986	Christmas – 13p, 18p, 22p, 31p & 34p values	Five	
2 December 1986	Christmas – 12p value	One	
1987
20 January 1987	Flower Photographs by Alfred Lammer	Four	
24 March 1987	300th Anniversary of "The Principia Mathematica" by Sir Isaac Newton	Four	
12 May 1987	Europa, British Architects in Europe	Four	
16 June 1987	Centenary of St. John Ambulance Brigade	Four	
21 July 1987	300th Anniversary of Order of the Thistle	Four	
8 September 1987	150th Anniversary of Queen Victoria's Accession	Four	
13 October 1987	Studio Pottery	Four	
17 November 1987	Christmas	Five	
1988
19 January 1988	Bicentenary of Linnean Society.	Four	
1 March 1988	400th Anniversary of Welsh Bible	Four	
22 March 1988	Sports Organisations	Four	
10 May 1988	Europa, Transport & Mail Services in 1930s	Four	
21 June 1988	Bicentenary of Australian Settlement (Joint issue with Australia Post)	Four	Greg Emery
19 July 1988	400th Anniversary of Spanish Armada	Five	
6 September 1988	Death Centenary of Edward Lear	Four	
27 September 1988	Death Centenary of Edward Lear, Miniature Sheet	One (MS)	
18 October 1988	New Issue of 'Castle' High Value Definitives	Four	
15 November 1988	Christmas	Five	
1989
17 January 1989	Centenary of Royal Society for the Protection of Birds	Four	
31 January 1989	Greetings Stamps	Five	
7 March 1989	Food and Farming Year	Four	
11 April 1989	Anniversaries	Four	
16 May 1989	Europa, Toys and games	Four	
4 July 1989	Industrial Archaeology	Four	Ronald Maddox
25 July 1989	Industrial Archaeology (Miniature Sheet)	One (MS)	Ronald Maddox
5 September 1989	150th Anniversary of Royal Microscopical Society	Four	
17 October 1989	Lord Mayor's Show, London	Five	
14 November 1989	Christmas	Five	David Gentleman

== Sources ==
- Stanley Gibbons
- Concise Stamp Catalogue
- Gibbons Stamp Monthly
- Royal Mail Stamp Guide
- Royal Mail British Philatelic Bulletin

== Other decades ==
- United Kingdom commemorative stamps 1924–1969
- United Kingdom commemorative stamps 1970–1979
- United Kingdom commemorative stamps 1990–1999
- United Kingdom commemorative stamps 2000–2009
- United Kingdom commemorative stamps 2010–2019
- United Kingdom commemorative stamps 2020–2029

== See also ==
- Stanley Gibbons
- Stamp Collecting
- List of people on stamps
- Philately
- Stamps
- PHQ Cards
