= United Kingdom commemorative stamps 2010–2019 =

This is a list of the commemorative stamps of the United Kingdom for the years 2010–2019.

== List ==
=== 2010 ===
Issue number	Issue date	Issue title	Details of stamps in issue	Designer(s)
2010
	2010-01-07	Classic Album Covers	1st Class – The Division Bell by Pink Floyd; A Rush of Blood to the Head by Coldplay; Power, Corruption & Lies by New Order; Let It Bleed by The Rolling Stones; London Calling by The Clash; Tubular Bells by Mike Oldfield; IV by Led Zeppelin; Screamadelica by Primal Scream; The Rise and Fall of Ziggy Stardust and the Spiders from Mars by David Bowie; Parklife by Blur.	Studio Dempsey, in collaboration with albums' contemporary copyright owners acting as artwork licensees
	2010-01-26	Smilers 2010	Consumer x4; Business x6	
	2010-02-02	Girlguiding UK	1st Class – Rainbows; 56p – Brownies; 81p – Guides; 90p – Senior Section	Together Design
	2010-02-25	The Royal Society	1st Class – Robert Boyle, Sir Isaac Newton, Benjamin Franklin, Edward Jenner, Charles Babbage, Alfred Russel Wallace, Joseph Lister, Ernest Rutherford, Dorothy Hodgkin, Sir Nicholas Shackleton	Hat-trick Design
	2010-03-11	Battersea Dogs and Cats Home	1st Class – Pixie, Button, Herbie, Mr Tumnus, Tafka, Boris Casey, Tigger, Leonard, Tia	CDT Design
	2010-03-23	House of Stuart	1st Class – James I (1406–1437), James II (1437–1460), James III (1460–1488); 62p – James IV (1488–1513), James V (1513–1542);81p – Mary (1542–1567), James VI (1567–1625)	Atelier Works
	2010-04-13	Mammals (Action for Species 4)	Humpback whale, wildcat, brown long-eared bat, polecat, sperm whale, water vole, greater horseshoe bat, otter, dormouse, hedgehog	
	2010-05-06	London 2010 Festival of Stamps	Accession of King George V – 1st Class and £1	Sedley Place
	2010-05-08	London 2010 Festival of Stamps	1st Class X 2: One Penny (Red), One and a Half Penny (Brown) - from British Empire Exhibition 1924); £1 X 2: One Pound Seahorses (Green), Ten Shillings Seahorses (Blue) - first issued in 1913)	Sedley Place
	2010-05-13	Britain Alone	1st Class – Winston Churchill, Land Girls; 60p – Home Guard, Evacuees; 67p – Air Raid Wardens, Women in Factories; 97p – Royal Broadcast, Fire Service Miniature Sheet: 1st Class – Evacuation of British soldiers from the beach at Dunkirk; 60p – The Little Fleet; 88p – British soldiers on board a Royal Navy destroyer; 97p – Two Boats from Dunkirk	Why Not Associates
	2010-06-15	House of Stuart	1st class X 2: James I, Charles I; 60p X 2: Charles II, James II; 67p X 2: William III, Mary II; 88p X 2: Anne, Stuart I; Miniature Sheet: 1st Class – 1st Class: William Harvey - 1628 Blood circulation; 60p: Civil War - 1645 Battle of Naseby; 88p: John Milton - 1667 Paradise Lost; 97p: John Vanbrugh - 1712 Castle Howard	
	2010-07-27	The London 2012 Olympic & Paralympic Games II	1st Class – Rowing, Shooting, Modern Pentathlon, Taekwondo, Cycling, Table Tennis, Hockey, Football, Goalball, Boxing	Studio David Hillman
	2010-08-19	Great British Railways 1	1st Class – LMS Coronation Class, BR Class 9F; 67p – GWR King Class, LNER Class A1; 97p – LMS NCC Class WT, SR King Arthur Class	Delaney Design Consultants
	2010-09-16	Medical Breakthroughs	1st Class – Heart-regulating beta-blockers synthesised by Sir James Black, 1962; 58p – Antibiotic properties of penicillin discovered by Sir Alexander Fleming, 1928; 60p – Total hip replacement operation pioneered by Sir John Charnley, 1962; 67p – Artificial lens implant surgery pioneered by Sir Harold Ridley, 1949; 88p – Malaria parasite transmitted by mosquitoes proved by Sir Ronald Ross, 1897; 97p – Computed tomography scanner invented by Sir Godfrey Hounsfield, 1971	Howard Brown
	2010-10-12	Winnie-the-Pooh	1st Class – Winnie-the-Pooh, Piglet and Christopher Robin; 58p – Winnie-the-Pooh and Piglet; 60p – Winnie-the-Pooh and Rabbit; 67p – Winnie-the-Pooh and Eeyore; 88p – Winnie-the-Pooh and friends; 97p – Winnie-the-Pooh and Tigger.	Magpie Studio
	2010-11-02	Christmas 2010	2nd Class – Wallace and Gromit carol singing; 1st Class – Gromit posting Christmas cards; 2nd Class Large – Wallace and Gromit carol singing; 1st Class Large – Gromit posting Christmas cards; 60p – Wallace dressing the Christmas tree; 97p – Gromit with Christmas pudding; £1.46 – Gromit's Christmas pullover.	Aardman Animations Ltd and Royal Mail

=== 2011 ===
Issue number	Issue date	Issue title	Details of stamps in issue	Designer(s)
2011
451	2011-01-11	FAB: The Genius of Gerry Anderson	1st Class – Joe 90, Captain Scarlet, Thunderbirds; 97p – Stingray, Fireball XL5, Supercar	GBH
	2011-01-24	Post & Go Stamps – Birds of Britain II	1st Class X 6: blackbird, chaffinch, collared dove, long-tailed tit, greenfinch, magpie	Royal Mail Group Ltd
452	2011-02-01	Classic Locomotives of England	1st Class – BR Dean Goods No. 2532; 60p – Peckett R2 Thor; 88p – L & YR 1093 No. 1100; 97p – BR WD No. 90662	Delaney Design Consultants
453	2011-02-24	Musicals	1st Class – Oliver!, Blood Brothers, We Will Rock You, Monty Python's Spamalot; 97p – The Rocky Horror Show, Me and My Girl, Return to the Forbidden Planet, Billy Elliot	Webb and Webb
454	2011-03-08	Magical Realms	1st Class – Rincewind, Nanny Ogg (from Terry Pratchett's Discworld), Dumbledore, Voldemort (from Harry Potter); 60p – Merlin, Morgan le Fay (from Arthurian legend); 97p – Aslan, The White Witch (from The Chronicles of Narnia).	So Design Consultants
454	2011-03-22	World Wildlife Fund	1st Class – African elephant, gorilla, Siberian tiger, polar bear, Amur leopard, Iberian lynx, red panda, black rhinoceros, African wild dog, golden lion tamarin, spider monkey; 60p – hyacinth macaw; 88p – poison dart frog; 97p – jaguar	Rose Design Consultants
455	2011-04-12	The Royal Shakespeare Company	1st Class – Hamlet; 66p – The Tempest; 68p – Henry VI; 76p – King Lear; £1.00 – A Midsummer Night's Dream; £1.10p – Romeo and Juliet; Miniature sheet: 1st Class – Royal Shakespeare Theatre; 68p – Swan Theatre; 76p – The Courtyard Theatre; £1.00 – The Other Place	Hat-trick design
M20	2011-04-21	The Royal Wedding (William and Kate)	Miniature sheet which features Prince William's coat of arms. 1st Class and £1.10	
456	2011-05-05	Morris & Co	2 X 1st: Cray – William Morris, Cherries – Philip Webb, 76p X 2: Seaweed – John Henry Dearle, Peony – Kate Faulkner, £1.10 X 2: Acanthus – William Morris and William De Morgan, The Merchant's Daughter – Edward Burne-Jones	
	2011-05-19	Post & Go Stamps: Birds of Britain III	6 X 1st Class: Mallard, Greylag Goose, Kingfisher, Moorhen, Mute Swan, Great Crested Grebe	Kate Stephens
457	2011-06-14	Thomas the Tank Engine	1st Class: Thomas the Tank Engine; 66p: James; 68p: Percy; 76p: Daisy; £1.00: Toby; £1.10: Gordon; Miniature Sheet: 1st Class: Thomas and Bertie the Bus; 68p: James; 76p: Percy; £1.00: Henry.	
458	2011-07-27	London 2012 Olympic and Paralympic Games 3	1st Class – Paralympic Games: Sailing; Athletics: Field; Volleyball; Wrestling; Wheelchair Rugby; Wheelchair Tennis; Fencing; Gymnastics; Triathlon; Handball	Studio David Hillman
459	2011-08-23	The Crown Jewels	1st Class – The Sovereign's Sceptre with Cross; St Edward's Crown; 68p – Rod and Sceptre with Doves; Queen Mary's Crown; 76p – The Sovereign's Orb; Jewelled Sword of Offering; £1.10 – Imperial State Crown; Coronation Spoon	Purpose
460	2011-09-09	Aerial Post	1st Class: Hamel receives first mail bag; 68p: Hamel ready to leave Hendon; £1.00: Greswell's Bleriot at Windsor; £1.10: Airmail delivered at Windsor.	
461	2011-09-15	The House of Hanover	The House of Hanover: 1st Class X 2: George I (1714–1727), George II (1727–1760); 76p X 2: George III (1760–1820), George IV (1820–1830); £1.10 X 2: William IV (1830–1837), Victoria (1837–1901). The Age of Hanoverians: 1st: Robert Walpole – 1721 First Prime Minister; 68p: Robert Adam – 1763 Kedleston Hall; 76p: Penny Black – 1840 Uniform Postage; £1.00: Queen Victoria 1897 Diamond Jubilee.	
	2011-09-16	Birds of Britain IV Post & Go Stamps	1st Class X 6: Puffin, Gannet, Oystercatcher, Ringed Plover, Cormorant, Arctic Tern.	
462	2011-10-13	UK A–Z Part 1	1st Class X 12: Angel of the North, Blackpool Tower, Carrick-a-Rede, Downing Street, Edinburgh Castle, Forth Railway Bridge, Glastonbury Tor, Harlech Castle, Ironbridge, Jodrell Bank, Kursaal, Lindisfarne Priory.	
463	2011-11-08	Christmas 2011	2nd Class X 1: Joseph visited by the Angel; 1st Class X 1: Madonna and Child; 2nd Large X 1: Joseph visited by the Angel; 1st Large X 1: Madonna and Child; 68p X 1: Baby Jesus in the manger; £1.10 X 1: Shepherds visited by the Angel; £1.65 X 1: Wise men and star.	

=== 2012 ===
Issue number	Issue date	Issue title	Details of stamps in issue	Designer(s)
2012
92	2012.01.05	London 2012 Olympic and Paralympic Games Definitives	4 Stamps: 2 X 1st Class: Olympic Definitive, Paralympic Definitive, 2 X Worldwide: Olympic Definitive, Paralympic Definitive	Royal Mail Group
465	2012.01.10	Roald Dahl	6 Stamps: 1st Class: Charlie and the Chocolate Factory, 66p: Fantastic Mr. Fox, 68p: James and the Giant Peach, 76p: Matilda, £1.00: The Twits, £1.10: The Witches 4 Stamps: 1st Class: The BFG and Sophie, 68p: The BFG and Sophie Wake the Giants, 76p: Sophie on the Queen's Window-Sill, £1.00: The BFG and Sophie at the Writing Desk.	Magpie Studio
LS80	2012.01.20	Year of the Dragon Smiler Sheet	20 Stamps: 1st Class X 20: A collection of different designs	Royal Mail
	2012.02.02	Kings & Queens – House of Windsor	1st Class: Edward VII (1901–1910), 68p: George V (1910–1936), 76p: Edward VIII (1936), £1.00, George VI (1936–1952), £1.10, Elizabeth II (1952–2022), 1st Class: Scott Expedition 1912, 68p: Second World War 1929–1945, 76p: Football Champions 1966, £1.00: Channel Tunnel	Atelier Works
	2012.02.06	Diamond Jubilee definitive	1st Class X 6: Dorothy Wilding definitive, Robert Austin banknote portrait, Harry Eccleston banknote portrait, Mary Gillick coinage portrait, Arnold Machin coinage portrait, Diamond Jubilee Machin	
	2012.02.23	Britons of Distinction	1st Class X 10: Sir Basil Spence, Frederick Delius, Mary ‘May’ Morris, Odette Hallowes, Thomas Newcomen, Kathleen Ferrier, Augustus Pugin, Montague Rhodes James, Alan Turing, Joan Mary Fry	
	2012.02.24	Post & Go – British Farm Animals I – Sheep	1st Class X 6: Welsh Mountain Badger Face, Dalesbred, Jacob, Suffolk, Soay, Leicester Longwool	
	2012.03.08	Classic Locomotives of Scotland	1st Class X 1: BR D34 Nos. 62471 and 62496; 68p X 1: BR D40 No. 62276, £1 X 1: Andrew Barclay No. 807, £1.10 X 1: BR 4P No. 54767	
	2012.03.20	World of Comics	1st Class X 10: The Dandy, The Beano, The Eagle, The Topper, Tiger, Bunty, Buster, Valiant, Twinkle, 2000 AD	
	2012.04.10	RMS Titanic	1st Class X 10: Various. Centenary of the Titanic.	
470	2012.04.10	UK A-Z (part 2)	1st Class X 14: Manchester Town Hall, Narrow Water Castle, Old Bailey, Portmeirion, The Queens College Oxford, Roman Baths, Stirling Castle, Tyne Bridge, Urquhart Castle, Victoria and Albert Museum, White Cliffs of Dover, Station X Bletchley Park, York Minster, ZSL London Zoo.	
	2012.04.24	Post & Go: British Farm Animals II – Pigs	1st Class X 6: Berkshire, Oxford Sandy and Black, Tamworth, Gloucestershire Old Spots, Welsh, British Saddleback	
	2012.05.15	Great British Fashion	1st Class X 8: Hardy Amies, Norman Hartnell, Granny Takes a Trip, Ossie Clark print by Celia Birtwell, Tommy Nutter, Jean Muir, Zandra Rhodes, Vivienne Westwood, Paul Smith, Alexander McQueen.	Johnson Banks
	2012.05.21	Post & Go: 1st Class: Union Flag		
	2012.05.31	The Queen's Diamond Jubilee	1st Class X 2: Golden Jubilee - 2002, Trooping the Colour - 1967; 77p X 2: The Royal Welsh - 2007, First Christmas TV Broadcast - 1957; 87p X 2: Silver Jubilee Walkabout -1977, Garter Ceremony - 1997; £1.28 X 2: United Nations Address - 2012, Commonwealth Games - 1982;	
	2012.06.19	Charles Dickens	1st Class: Mr Pickwick (The Pickwick Papers); 2nd Class: Mr Bumble (Oliver Twist); 77p: The Marchioness (The Old Curiosity Shop); 87p: Mrs Gamp (Martin Chuzzlewit); £1.28: Captain Cuttle (Dombey and Son); £1.90: Mr Micawber (David Copperfield).	
	Jul 27	London 2012 Olympics: Welcome		
	Aug 29	London 2012 Paralympics: Welcome		
	Sep 27	London 2012 Olympics: Memories		
	Sep 28	Faststamps: Cattle		
	Oct 16	Space Science		
	Nov 8	Christmas		

=== 2013 ===
Issue number	Issue date	Issue title	Details of stamps in issue	Designer(s)
2013
480	2013-01-09	150th anniversary of the London Underground	The stamps were issued illustrated the Metropolitan Railway (2nd Class), the deep-tube tunnels (2nd Class), Edwardian commuters (1st Class), Boston Manor station (1st Class), 1938 tube stock (£1.28) and Canary Wharf station (£1.28). A miniature sheet reproduced classic London Underground posters.	
481	2013-02-21	Jane Austen	Issue to mark the bicentenary of the publication of Jane Austen's novel Pride and Prejudice.	
P&G 11	2013-02-22	Post and Go – Freshwater Life 1 : Ponds Stamp Set	A three-issue Post & Go series with first set showing pond life, the second life in lakes and the third river creatures. The Ponds set featured three common species, the three-spined stickleback, emperor dragonfly and smooth newt, and three endangered species: lesser silver water beetle, fairy shrimp and glutinous snail. The stamps were designed by Kate Stephens and the illustrations were by Chris Wormell.	
482	2013-03-26	Doctor Who (50th anniversary)	11 x 1st class – First Doctor (William Hartnell), Second Doctor (Patrick Troughton), Third Doctor (Jon Pertwee), Fourth Doctor (Tom Baker), Fifth Doctor (Peter Davison), Sixth Doctor (Colin Baker), Seventh Doctor (Sylvester McCoy), Eighth Doctor (Paul McGann), Ninth Doctor (Christopher Eccleston), Tenth Doctor (David Tennant) and Eleventh Doctor (Matt Smith); minisheet containing 1 x 1st class definitive – TARDIS, and 4 x 2nd class monsters – Dalek, Ood, Weeping Angel and Cyberman.	
483	2013-04-16	Great Britons	1st Class – Norman Parkinson, Vivien Leigh, Peter Cushing, David Lloyd George, Elizabeth David, John Archer, Benjamin Britten, Mary Leakey, Bill Shankly, Richard Dimbleby.	Bradbury
484	2013-05-09	Football Heroes	1st Class X 11: Jimmy Greaves, John Charles, Gordon Banks, George Best, John Barnes, Kevin Keegan, Denis Law, Bobby Moore, Bryan Robson, Dave Mackay, Bobby Charlton.	Bradbury
485	2013-05-30	Her Majesty the Queen (six decades of royal portraits)	2nd Class: Portrait by Terence Cuneo 1953, 1st Class: Portrait by Nicky Philipps 2013, 78p: Portrait by Andrew Festing 1999, 88p: Portrait by Pietro Annigoni 1955, £1.28: Portrait by Sergei Pavlenko 2000, £1.88: Portrait by Richard Stone 1992*	Benhem
486	2013-06-18	Classic Locomotives of Northern Ireland	1st Class: UTA W Class No. 103, 78p: UTA SG3 Class No. 35, 88p: Peckett No. 2, £1.28: CDRJC Class 5 No. 4	Benhem
487	2013-07-11	Butterflies	1st class X 10: comma, orange tip, small copper, chalkhill blue, swallowtail, purple emperor, marsh fritillary, brimstone, red admiral, marbled white.	Benhen
M21	2013-08-08	Andy Murray	1st X 2 and £1.28 X 2 (newly crowned Wimbledon champion)	Bradbury
488	2013-08-13	British Auto Legends	1st Class X 3: Jaguar E-Type, Rolls-Royce Silver Shadow, Aston Martin DB5, £1.28 X 3: MG MGB, Morgan Plus 8, Lotus Esprit. Miniature Sheet 1st Class X 4: Royal Mail Morris Minor Van, Austin Black Cab, Ford Anglia Police Panda Car, Land Rover Defender Coastguard.	Buckingham
489	2013-09-19	Merchant Navy	1st Class X 3: East Indiaman Atlas (1813), RMS Britannia (1840), Cutty Sark (1870), £1.28 X 3: Clan Matheson (1919), Queen Elizabeth (1940), Lord Hinton (1986).	Benhem
490	2013-10-10	Dinosaurs	1st Class X 10: Polacanthus, Ichthyosaurus, Iguanodon, Ornithocheirus, Baryonyx, Dimorphodon, Hypsilophodon, Cetiosaurus, Megalosaurus, Plesiosaurus.	Royal Mail
491	2013-11-05	Christmas	2nd Class: Madonna and Child, 2nd Class Large: Madonna and Child, 1st Class: Virgin and Child, 1st Class Large: Virgin and Child, 88p: Praying to the Virgin, £1.28: La Vierge au Lys, £1.88: Theotokos, Mother of God.	Royal Mail

=== 2014 ===
Issue number	Issue date	Issue title	Details of stamps in issue	Designer(s)
2014
493	2014-01-07	Classic Children's TV	12 1st Class Stamps: Andy Pandy, Ivor the Engine, Dougal from The Magic Roundabout, Windy Miller from Camberwick Green, Mr Benn, Great Uncle Bulgaria from The Wombles, Bagpuss, Paddington Bear, Postman Pat, Bob the Builder, Peppa Pig, Shaun the Sheep	Interbang
494	2014-02-04	Working Horses	6 Stamps: 1st Class: Riding for the Disabled Association, Ceremonial horses of the Kings Troop, 88p: Dray Horses pulling a dray from Hook Norton Brewery, Royal Mews Carriage Horses, £1.28: pair of police horses; a forestry horse.	Michael Denny and Harold Battern
495	2014-02-20	Classic Locomotives of Wales	4 Stamps: 1st Class: – LMS No. 7720 leaves the Britannia Bridge with a Bangor-to-Holyhead local train c. 1930, 78p: Hunslet No. 589 Blanche rounds the curve off 'The Cob' passing Pen Cob Halt on the Ffestiniog Railway 1964, 88p: W&LLR No. 822 The Earl waits on Union Street Welshpool while a car is moved from the line, £1.28: BR No. 5652 heads a coal train at Cwmbargoed Merthyr Tydfil 1959	Delaney Design Consultants
496	2014-03-25	Remarkable Lives	10 1st Class Stamps: Roy Plomley, Barbara Ward, Joe Mercer, Kenneth More, Dylan Thomas, Sir Alec Guinness, Noor Inayat Khan, Max Perutz, Joan Littlewood, Abram Games.	Purpose
497	2014-04-15	Buckingham Palace	6 1st Class Stamps: Buckingham Palace 2014, 1862, 1846, Buckingham House 1819, 1714, 1700	Howard Brown
498	2014-05-13	Great British Film	1st Class: A Matter of Life and Death, Lawrence of Arabia, 2001 A Space Odyssey, £1.28: Chariots of Fire, Secrets & Lies and Bend It Like Beckham	Johnson Banks
499	2014-06-05	Sustainable Fish	10 1st Class: herring, red gurnard, dab, pouting, Cornish sardine, common skate, spiny dogfish, wolffish, sturgeon, conger eel	Kate Stephens
500	2014-07-17	Glasgow 2014 (XX Commonwealth Games)	2nd Class: Judo, 1st Class: Swimming, 97p: Marathon, £1.28: Squash, £1.47: Netball, £2.15: Para-Sport Track Cycling	Howard Brown
501	2014-07-28	The Great War 1914	1st class stamps: Poppy, 'For the Fallen', Private William Cecil Tickle, £1.47 stamps: A Star Shell, The Response, Newcastle (memorial), Princess Mary's Gift Fund Box	Hat-trick Design
502	2014-09-18	Piers Proms and Pavilions: Seaside Architecture	1st class: Eastbourne Bandstand, Tinside Lido Plymouth, 97p: Bangor Pier, Southwold Lighthouse, £1.28: Casino Blackpool Pleasure Beach, Bexhill-on-Sea Shelter	Why Not Associates
503	2014-10-14	British Prime Ministers	1st class: Margaret Thatcher, Harold Wilson, Clement Attlee, Winston Churchill, 97p: William Gladstone, Robert Peel, Charles Grey, William Pitt the Younger	Together
504	2014-11-04	Christmas 2014	2nd class and 2nd Large, 1st class and 1st Large, £1.28, £1.47, £2.15	Andrew Bannecker

=== 2015 ===
Issue number	Issue date	Issue title	Details of stamps in issue	Designer(s)
2015
506	2015.01.06	Alice's Adventures in Wonderland	10 stamps marking the 150th anniversary of Lewis Carroll’s novel: The White Rabbit, Drink Me, The Cheshire Cat, The Queen of Hearts, Alice's Evidence, Down the Rabbit Hole, The White Rabbit's House, A Mad Tea Party, The Game of Croquet, A Pack of Cards.	Godfrey Design
M23	2015.01.20	Smilers Refresh 2015	1st Class: Well Done, 1st Class: Mum, 1st Class: New Baby, 1st Class: Wedding, 1st Class: Happy Birthday, 1st Class: Dad, 1st Class: Grandparent and 1st Class: Love.	Jenny Bowers
507	2015.02.19	Inventive Britain	Colossus, Cats-eyes, Stainless Steel, Carbon Fibre, DNA Sequencing, i-limb, World Wide Web and Fibre Optics.	GBH
508	2015.03.05	Bridges	Tarr Steps, Row Bridge – Mosedale Beck, Pulteney Bridge, Craigellachie Bridge, Menai Suspension Bridge, High Level Bridge, Royal Border Bridge, Tees Transporter Bridge, Humber Bridge, Peace Bridge (Foyle)	GBH
509	2015.04.01	Comedy Greats	Spike Milligan, The Two Ronnies, Billy Connolly, Morecambe and Wise, Norman Wisdom, Lenny Henry, Peter Cook and Dudley Moore, Monty Python, French and Saunders, Victoria Wood.	
510	2015.05.06	The 175th Anniversary of the Penny Black	1st Class X 2: Penny Black and Two Penny Blue.	Sedley Place
511	2015.05.14	First World War	Poppies, 'All the Hills and Vales Along', Rifleman Kulbir Thapa, The Kensingtons at Laventie by Eric Kennington, Cape Helles Gallipoli, London Irish Rifles' football.	Hat Trick Design
512	2015.06.02	Magna Carta	1st Class: Magna Carta (1215), 1st Class: Simon de Montfort's Parliament (1265), £1.33: Bill of Rights (1689), £1.33: American Bill of Rights (1791) and £1.52: Universal Declaration of Human Rights (1948).	Howard Brown
513	2015.06.18	The Battle of Waterloo	1st Class: Waterloo – The defence of Hougoumont, 1st Class: Waterloo – The Scots Greys during the charge of the Union Brigade, £1.00: Waterloo – The French cavalry's assault on Allied defensive squares, £1.00: Waterloo – The defence of La Haye Sainte by the King's German Legion, £1.52: Waterloo – The capture of Plancenoit by the Prussians, £1.52: Waterloo – The French Imperial Guard's final assault and a Miniature Sheet: £1.33: 92nd Gordon Highlanders, 1st Class: Light Infantry, King's German Legion, 1st Class: Prussian Infantryman and £1.33: French Imperial Guard Grenadier.	Silk Pearce
514	2015.07.16	The 75th Anniversary of the Battle of Britain	1st Class: Pilots scramble to their Hurricanes, 1st Class: Supermarine Spitfires on patrol, 1st Class: Armourer replaces ammunition boxes, £1.33: Spotters of the Auxiliary Territorial Service, £1.33: Operations Room at Bentley Priory and £1.33: Pilots of 32 Squadron await orders.	The Team
515	2015.08.18	Bees	2nd Class: scabious bee, 1st Class: great yellow bumblebee, £1.00: northern colletes bee, £1.33: bilberry bumblebee, £1.52: large mason bee and £2.25: potter flower bee.	Anna Ekelund
516	2015.09.09	HM Queen Elizabeth II – Long To Reign Over Us	1st Class: William Wyon's City Medal, 1st Class: Dorothy Wilding's Portrait, 1st Class: Machin Definitive, £1.52: The Badge of the House of Windsor and £1.52: The Queen's Personal Flag.	Sedley Place
517	2015.09.18	Rugby World Cup	2nd Class: Tackle, 2nd Class: Scrum, 1st Class: Try, 1st Class: Conversion, £1.00: Pass, £1.00: Drop Goal, £1.52: Ruck and £1.52: Line-Out.	Hat-Trick Design
518	2015.10.06	Star Wars	1st Class – Eighteen character stamps, featuring: Luke Skywalker, Han Solo, Princess Leia, Darth Vader, Yoda, Obi-Wan Kenobi, Boba Fett, Palpatine, a Stormtrooper, Rey, Finn and Kylo Ren. Six-stamp set of Star Wars spaceships including the Millennium Falcon, a TIE fighter, an X-wing fighter and an AT-AT.	Malcolm Tween.
519	2015.11.03	Christmas 2015	2nd Class & 2nd Large: The Journey to Bethlehem, 1st Class & 1st Large: The Nativity, £1.00: The Animals of the Nativity, £1.33: The Shepherds, £1.52: The Three Wise Men; and £2.25: The Annunciation.	Studio David Hillman & David Holmes

=== 2016 ===
Issue number	Issue date	Issue title	Details of stamps in issue	Designer(s)
2016
521	2016.01.07	Ernest Shackleton and The Endurance Expedition	8 stamps – 1st Class: Entering the Antarctic Ice, 1st Class: Endurance frozen in pack ice, £1.00: Striving to free Endurance, £1.00: Trapped in a pressure trap, £1.33: Patience Camp, £1.33: Safe arrival at Elephant Island, £1.52: Setting out for South Georgia and £1.52: Rescue of Endurance crew.	Robert Maude & Sarah Davies
522	2016.02.17	Royal Mail 500	6 stamps – 1st Class: Sir Brian Tuke, Master of the Posts, 1st Class: A Packet Ship, 1st Class: A Penfold Pillar Box, £1.52: River Post, £1.52: Mail Coach and £1.52: Medway Mail Centre.	Atelier works
523	2016.03.15	British Humanitarians	3 stamps – 1st Class: Nicholas Winton, Sue Ryder and John Boyd Orr, 3 stamps £1.33: Eglantyne Jebb, Joseph Rowntree, Josephine Butler.	Hat-Trick Design
524	2016.04.05	William Shakespeare	10 stamps – 1st Class: Hamlet, Julius Caesar, Romeo and Juliet, As You Like It, Much Ado About Nothing, Sonnet, Venus and Adonis, The Tempest, Macbeth and Richard II.	The Chase
525	2016.04.21	HM The Queen's 90th Birthday	6 stamps – 1st Class: HM The Queen with her father 1930, HM The Queen attends the State Opening of Parliament 2012, HM The Queen with Princess Anne and Prince Charles 1952, £1.52: HM The Queen Visits New Zealand 1977, HM The Queen with the Duke of Edinburgh 1957, HM The Queen with Nelson Mandela 1996	Kate Stephens
526	2016.05.17	Animail	6 stamps – 1st Class: woodpecker, snake, £1.05: chimpanzee, bat, £1.33: orangutan, koala.	Osborne Rose
527	2016.06.21	The Great War 1916	6 stamps – 1st Class: Battlefield Poppy, To My Brother Vera Britain, Munitions Worker Lottie Meade, £1.52: Travoys Arriving With Wounded... by Stanley Spencer, Thiepval Memorial Somme France, Captain AC Green's Battle of Jutland Medal. 4 stamps – £1.00: The Post Office Riffles, £1.33: Delivering the Mail on the Home Front, £1.00: Home Depot at Regent's Park London, £1.33: Writing a Letter From the Western Front	Hat-Trick Design
528	2016.07.07	Music Giants: Pink Floyd	1st class x 6 designs: The Piper at the Gates of Dawn, Atom Heart Mother, The Dark Side of the Moon, UFO Club, The Dark Side of the Moon Tour. 5 stamps 1st £1.52: Wish You Were Here, Animals, The Endless River, The Wall Tour, The Division Bell Tour	Royal Mail Group Ltd
529	2016.07.28	Beatrix Potter	6 stamps – 1st Class: Peter Rabbit, Mrs Tiggy-Winkle, £1.33: Squirrel Nutkin, Jemima Puddle-Duck, £1.52: Tom Kitten, Benjamin Bunny. Miniature Sheet 4 stamps – 1st class x 2 and £1.33 x 2: The Tale of Peter Rabbit.	Charlie Smith Design (stamps) and Magpie Studio (MS)
530	2016.08.16	Landscape Gardens	8 Stamps: 2nd Class X 2: Blenheim Palace, Longleat, 1st Class X 2: Compton Verney, Highclere Castle, £1.05 X 2: Alnwick Castle, Berrington Hall, £1.33 X 2: Stowe, Croome Park.	Robert Maude and Sarah Davies
531	2016.09.02	The Great Fire of London	6 stamps presented in three se-tenant strips of two stamps: 1st Class X 2: The Beginning, £1.05 X 2: The Spread, and £1.52 X 2: The end of the Fire.	The Chase
532	2016.09.15	Agatha Christie	6 Stamps: 1st Class X 2: Murder on the Orient Express, And Then There Were None, £1.33 X 2: The Mysterious Affair at Styles, The Murder of Roger Ackroyd, £1.52 X 2: The Body in the Library, A Murder is Announced	Studio Sutherland
533	2016.10.20	Mr Men and Little Miss	10 Stamps X 1st Class: Mr. Happy, Little Miss Naughty, Mr. Bump, Little Miss Sunshine, Mr. Tickle, Mr. Grumpy, Little Miss Princess, Mr. Strong, Little Miss Christmas, Mr. Messy	Supple Studio
534	2016.11.08	Christmas 2016	8 stamps: 2nd Class: Snowman, 1st Class: Robin, £1.05: Christmas Tree, £1.33: Lantern, £1.52: Stocking, £2.35: Christmas Pudding, 2nd Class Large: Snowman, 1st Class Large: Robin	The Chase

=== 2017 ===
Issue number	Issue date	Issue title	Details of stamps in issue	Designer(s)
2017
535	2017.01.09	Ancient Britain	1st Class X 2: Battersea Shield, Skara Brae Village, £1.05 X 2: Star Carr Head Dress, Maiden Castle Hill Fort, £1.33 X 2: Avebury Stone Circles, Drumbrest Horns, £1.52 X 2: Grime's Graves Flint Mines, Mold Cape	True North
1/17	2017.02.06	65th Anniversary of the Accession of Queen Elizabeth II	£5.00: definitive	Royal Mail Group
536	2017.02.15	Windsor Castle	1st Class X 3: The Long Walk, The Round Tower, The Norman Gate, £1.52 X 3: St George's Hall, The Queen's Ballroom, The Waterloo Chamber	Up
537	2017.03.14	Music Giants: David Bowie	1st Class X 3: Hunky Dory (1971), Aladdin Sane (1973), "Heroes" (1977), £1.52 X 3: Let's Dance (1983), Earthling (1997), Blackstar (2016), Miniature sheet: 1st Class X 2: Ziggy Stardust Tour (1972), Serious Moonlight Tour (1983) Tours, £1.52 X 2: Isolar II Tour (1978), A Reality Tour (2004). The background image is of the Glass Spider Tour (1987)	
2/17	2017.03.14	New Tariff Definitive Stamps	£1.17, £1.40, £1.57, £2.27, £2.55.	Royal Mail Group
539	2017.04.06	Racehorse Legends	1st Class X 2: Frankel, Red Rum, £1.17 X 2 Shergar, Kauto Star, £1.40 X 2: Desert Orchid, Brigadier Gerard, £1.57 X 2: Arkle, Estimate	Together Design
540	2017.05.04	Songbirds	1st Class X 10: great tit, wren, willow warbler, goldcrest, skylark, blackcap, song thrush, nightingale, cuckoo, yellowhammer	Osborne Ross
540	2017.06.05	The Machin Definitive Anniversary	5p X 1: 1971; 20p X 1: 1990; 1st X 4: 1993, 2000, 2006, 2013; £1.00 X 1: 2017	Atelier Design
542	2017.06.20	Windmills and Watermills	1st Class X 2: Nutley Windmill (East Sussex), New Abbey Corn Mill (Dumfries and Galloway); £1.40 X 2: Ballycopeland Windmill (Country Down), Cheddleton Flint Mill (Staffordshire); £1.57 X 2: Woodchurch Windmill (Kent), Felin Cochwillan Mill (Gwynedd)	Atelier Design
543	2017.07.13	Landmark Buildings	1st Class X 10: Aquatics Centre at the Queen Elizabeth Olympic Park London; Library of Birmingham; Clyde Auditorium Glasgow (now known as the SEC Armadillo); Scottish Parliament Building Edinburgh; Giant's Causeway Visitor Centre County Antrim; National Assembly for Wales Cardiff; Eden Project at St Austell Cornwall; Everyman Theatre Liverpool; Imperial War Museum At Manchester; Switch House at the Tate Modern London.	GBH
544	2017.07.31	The First World War – 1917 Stamp Set	1st Class X 3: Shattered Poppy, John Ross; Dead Man's Dump, Isaac Rosenberg; Nurses Elsie Knocker and Mairi Chisholm; £1.57 X 3: Dry Docked for Scaling and Painting, Edward Wadsworth; Tyne Cot Cemetery, Belgium; Private Lemuel Thomas Rees' Life Saving Bible.	Hat-Trick Design
544	2017.07.31	The First World War – 1917 Prestige Stamp Book	1st Class X 8: Features the stamp pane with the Poppy stamp from the 2010 Smilers® Miniature Sheet.	Hat-Trick Design
545	2017.08.22	Classic Toys	1st Class X 10: The Merrythought Bear, Sindy, Spirograph, Stickle Bricks, W. Britain Toy Figures, Spacehopper, Fuzzy-Felt, Meccano, Action Man, Hornby Dublo	Interabangk
P&G27	2017.09.13	Post & Go : Royal Mail Heritage : Mail by Air	6 X 1st class: First UK aerial mail (1911), Military mail flight (1919), International airmail (1933), Domestic airmail (1934), Flying boat airmail (1937), Flying boat airmail (1937), Datapost services (1980s)	Osborne Ross
546	2017.09.14	Ladybird Books	2nd Class X 2: Adventures from history (Nelson, Queen Elizabeth I, Florence Nightingale), Well-loved tales (The Gingerbread Boy, Cinderella, The Elves and the Shoemaker), 1st Class X 2: Key words reading scheme (1b Look at this, 2a We have fun, 4a Things We do), Early tales and rhymes (Smoke and Fluff, Tootles the Taxi, Piggly Plays Truant), £1.05 X 2: Hobbies and How it Works (Things to Make, Tricks and Magic, The Telephone), People at Work (The Postman, The Fireman, The Nurse), £1.33 X 2: Nature and Conservation (British Wild Flowers, Wild Life in Britain, Garden Flowers), Achievements (Ships, the Motor Car, Metals)	True North
547	2017.10.12	Star Wars	1st Class X 8: Maz Kanata, Chewbacca, Supreme Leader Snoke, Porg, BB-8, R2-D2, C-3PO and K-2SO	Malcolm Tween
548	2017.11.07	Christmas 2017	2nd class + 2nd class large: Arwen Wilson (9), Family of Snowpeople, 1st class + 1st class large: Ted Lewis-Clark (10) Father Christmas in the sky, 2nd class, 2nd class large, 1st class, 1st class large, £1.17, £1.40, £1.57, £2.27: Madonna & Child Designs	Royal Mail Group
xxx	2017.12.15	Lunar New Year of the Dog	First class X 1	Hat-Trick Design
549	2017.12.20	The Royal Wedding – Platinum Anniversary	The six-stamp Stamp Sheet features three pairs of stamps with images from 1947. Two stamps mark the Royal Engagement, two the Royal Wedding and two the Royal Honeymoon.	Mytton Williams

=== 2018 ===
Issue number	Issue date	Issue title	Details of stamps in issue	Designer(s)
2018
551	2018.01.23	Game of Thrones	10 X 1st Class: Sansa Stark, Jon Snow, Eddard Stark, Olenna Tyrell, Tywin Lannister, Tyrion Lannister, Cersei Lannister, Arya Stark, Jaime Lannister, and Daenerys Targaryen.	GBH
P&G28	2018.01.23	Post and Go – Game of Thrones	1 X 1st Class: Fire; 1 X 2nd Class: Ice.	GBH
552	2018.02.15	Votes for Women	2nd X 2: Lone Suffragette in Whitehall (c. 1908), The Great Pilgrimage of Suffragists (1913); 1st X 2: Suffragette Leaders at Earl's Court (1908), Women's Freedom League Poster Parade (c.1907); £1.40 X 2: Welsh Suffragettes – Coronation Procession (1911), Leigh and New Released from Prison (1908); £1.57 X 2: Sophia Duleep Singh sells the Suffragette (1913), Suffragette Prisoner's Pageant (1911)	Supple Studio
P&G29	2018.02.14	Royal Mail Heritage: Mail by Sea	6 X 1st class: Packet Antelope (1780), SS Great Western (1838), SS Britannia (1887), RMS Olympic (1911), RMS Queen Mary (1936), RMS St Helena (1990)	Royal Mail Group Ltd
553	2018.03.20	Royal Air Force Centenary	1st Class X 2: Hurricane Mk 1, Lightning F6; £1.40 X 2: Vulcan B2, Typhoon FGR4; £1.57 X 2: Sopwith Camel F1, Nimrod MR2.	Royal Mail Group Ltd
553	2018.03.20	Red Arrows Miniature Sheet	1st Class X 2: RAF Red Arrows – Flypast, RAF Red Arrows – Swan; £1.40 X 2: RAF Red Arrows – Synchro, RAF Red Arrows – Python.	Turner Duckworth
554	2018.04.17	Reintroduced Species	1st Class X 2: Osprey, large-blue butterfly; £1.45 X 2: Eurasian beaver, pool frog; £1.55 X 2: stinking hawk's-beard, sand lizard.	Godfrey Design
555	2018.05.11	Owls	10 X 1st Class: Barn owl, little owl, tawny owl, short-eared owl, long-eared owl, barn owl, little owl, tawny owl, short-eared owl, long-eared owl.	Atelier Works
M24	2018.05.19	The Royal Wedding	2 x 1st Class and 2 x 1.55 stamps. Using engagement photographs by Alexi Lubomirski	The Chase
556	2018.06.05	Royal Academy of Arts	2 X 1st Class: Summer Exhibition by Grayson Perry RA, Queen of the Sky by Fiona Rae RA; 2 X £1.25: St Kilda – The Great Sea Stacs by Norman Ackroyd RA, Inverleith Allotments and Edinburgh Castleby Barbara Rae RA;2 X £1.55: Queuing at the RA by Yinka Shonibare RA, Saying Goodbye by Tracey Emin RA.	Royal Mail Group Ltd
557	2018.06.26	Dad's Army	2nd Class X 2: Sergeant Wilson "Do you think that is wise sir?", Private Pike "I'll tell Mum!"; 1st Class X 2: Captain Mainwaring "You stupid boy!", Lance Corporal Jones "Don't panic! Don't panic!"; £1.45 X 2: Private Walker "It won't cost you much...", Private Frazer "We’re doomed. Doomed!"; £1.55 X 2: Private Godfrey "Do you think I might be excused?", Chief Warden Hodges "Put that light out!"	Royal Mail Group Ltd.
558	2018.07.31	Hampton Court Palace	1st Class X 3: Hampton Court Palace – South Front, Hampton Court Palace – West Front, Hampton Court Palace – East Front; £1.55 X 3: Hampton Court Palace – Pond Gardens, Hampton Court Palace – Maze, Hampton Court Palace – Fountain Garden; Miniature Sheet: 1st Class X 2: Hampton Court Palace – Great Hall, Hampton Court Palace – King's Great Bedchamber; £1.45 X 2: Hampton Court Palace – Chapel Royal, Hampton Court Palace – King's Staircase	Osborne Ross
559	2018.08.16	Captain Cook Endeavour Voyage	2nd Class X 2: Sir Joseph Banks, Chief Mourner of Tahiti; 1st Class X 2: Captain James Cook, drawings of the observations of the transit of Venus (1769); £1.45 X 2: Clianthus puniceus (scarlet clianthus), Volatinia jacarina (blue-black grassquit); Miniature Sheet: 1st Class X 2: Charting a new course – New Zealand and Australia, life on Raiatea – boathouse and canoes; £1.45 X 2: mapping New Zealand – a Maori clifftop fort, disaster avoided – repairs on the Endeavour River.	Howard Brown
560	2018.08.30	The Old Vic	1st Class X 2: The Dance of Death (1967), King Lear (2016); £1.25 X 2: Hamlet (1975), Hedda Gabler (1970); £1.45 X 2: No Man's Land (1975), Carmen Jones (1991); £1.55 X 2: Romeo and Juliet (1960), Henry V (1955).	Hat-Trick Design
xxx	2018.09.12	Postal Heritage: Mail by Bike	1st Class X 6: Pentacycle (1882), Motorcycle and trailer (1902), tricycle and basket (1920), bicycle (1949), motorcycle (1965), quad bike (2002)	Andrew Davidson
561	2018.09.13	The Great War 1918	1st Class X 3: 100 Poppies – Z and B Baran, Anthem for Doomed Youth – W Owen, Second Lieutenant Walter Tull; £1.55 X 3: We Are making A New World – P Nash, The Grave of the Unknown Warrior – Westminster Abbey – London, Lieutenant Francis Hopgood's Goggles	Hat-trick Design
562	2018.10.16	Harry Potter	1st Class X 10: Hermione Granger, Hogwarts Express, Harry Potter, Flying Ford Anglia, Ron Weasley, Hagrid's motorbike, Ginny Weasley, Triwizard Cup, Neville Longbottom, Knight Bus; Miniature Sheet: 1st X 5: Pomona Sprout, Horace Slughorn, Sybill Trelawney, Remus Lupin, Severus Snape	True North
563	2018.11.01	Christmas	2nd class, 2nd class large, 1st class, 1st class large, £1.25, £1.45, £1.55, £2.25 (all designs feature red pillar boxes, one per monarch, by Andrew Davidson)	Royal Mail Group Ltd
564	2018.11.14	Prince of Wales 70th Birthday	1st class x 3 designs: Charles in a blue jacket, Charles and Camilla, Charles with two sons (in uniform), £1.55 x 3 designs: Charles with two sons (polo tops), Charles in grey jacket, Charles on walkabout	
xxx	2018.11.15	Lunar New Year of the Pig	1st class x 1: Fireworks	

=== 2019 ===
Issue number	Issue date	Issue title	Details of stamps in issue	Designer(s)
2019
566	2019.01.15	Stamp Classics	1st class x 3 designs: Queen Victoria (1891), King Edward VII (1910), King George V (1913); £1.55 x 3 designs: King Edward VIII (1936), King George VI, Penny Black Centenary (1940), Queen Elizabeth II Coronation (1953).	hat-trick design
567	2019.02.13	Leonardo da Vinci	1st class x 12 designs: The skull sectioned, a sprig of guelder-rose, Studies of cats, a star-of-Bethlehem and other plants, the anatomy of the shoulder and foot, the head of Leda, the head of a bearded man, the skeleton, the head of St. Philip, a woman in a landscape, a design for an equestrian monument, the fall of light on a face.	Kate Stephens
568	2019.03.14	Marvel	15 stamps: 1st class x 10 designs: Spider-Man, Hulk, Thor, Iron Man, Doctor Strange, Captain Marvel, Peggy Carter, Black Panther, Captain Britain, Union Jack. Extra comic story: £1.45 x 1 designs: Captain Britain. 1st class x 3 designs: Thanos, Thor, Doctor Strange and Iron Man. Hulk and Iron Man. £1.25 x 1 designs: Together.	Interabang
569	2019.04.03	Birds of Prey	1st class x 10 designs: White-tailed eagle, merlin, hobby, buzzard, golden eagle, kestrel, goshawk, sparrowhawk, red kite, peregrine falcon	Royal Mail Group Ltd
570	2019.05.02	British Engineering	6 stamps: 1st Class x 2: Raspberry Pi, Falkirk Wheel, £1.55 x 2: Catalytic converter, Crossrail, £1.60 x 2: MRI Scanner, Bone-graft. Miniature Sheet: 4 Harrier GR.3 stamps: 1st Class x 2: Short Take-off, Conventional Flight, £1.55 x 2 designs: Transition to Landing, Vertical Landing.	Common Curiosity. Sheet: Turner Duckworth
571	2019.05.24	Queen Victoria Bicentenary	6 stamps: 1st Class x 2: Queen in her later years, Victoria and Prime Minister Benjamin Disraeli, £1.35 x 2: Queen Victoria with servant John Brown, Victoria wearing her Robes of State, £1.60 x 2: Marriage of Victoria and Albert, Princess Victoria aged eleven. Miniature Sheet (The legacy of Prince Albert) of 4 stamps: 1st Class x 2: Model Lodge, Kennington and Balmoral Castle, Scotland, £1.55 x 2: The New Crystal Palace, Sydenham and Royal Albert Hall, London.	Webb & Webb Design. Sheet: Common Curiosity
572	2019.06.06	D-Day	6 stamps: 1st Class x 2: British soldiers are briefed before embarkation, HMS Warspite, £1.35 x 2: Paratroopers synchronising watches, soldiers wade ashore on Juno, £1.60 x 2: An American light bomber provides air support, British troops take cover as they advance inland. Miniature sheet of 1st class x 5 stamps: Utah, Omaha, Gold, Juno, Sword.	Baxter and Bailey
573	2019.07.09	Curious Customs	8 stamps: 2nd Class x 2: Burning The Clocks, Padstow Obby Oss, 1st Class x 2: World Gurning Championships, Up Helly Aa, £1.55 x 2: Cheese Rolling, Halloween £1.60 x 2: Abbots Bromley Horn Dance, Bog Snorkelling.	NB Studio
574	2019.08.13	Forests (100 Years of the Forestry Commission)	6 stamps: 1st class x 2: Glen Affric, Westonbirt, The National Arboretum £1.55 x 2: Sherwood Forest, Coed y Brenin £1.60 x 2: Glenariff Forest, Kielder Forest	Up
575	2019.09.03	Elton John	8 Stamps: 1st Class X 4: Honky Château, Goodbye Yellow Brick Road, Caribou, Captain Fantastic and the Brown Dirt Cowboy; £1.55 X 4: Sleeping With the Past, The One, Made In England, Songs from the West Coast; Miniature sheet of 4 Stamps: 1st Class X 2: Madison Square Garden (2018), Dodger Stadium (1975); £1.55 X 2: Hammersmith Odeon (1973), Buckingham Palace (2012).	Studio Dempsey Photography
576	2019.09.13	Royal Navy Ships	8 stamps: 1st Class X 2: Mary Rose, HMS Queen Elizabeth; £1.35 X 2: HMS Victory, HMS Dreadnought; £1.55 X 2: HMS Warrior, Sovereign of the Seas; £1.60 X 2: HMS King George V, HMS Beagle.	Hat Trick Design
577	2019.10.10	The Gruffalo	6 Stamps: 1st Class X 3: Scrambled Snake, Gruffalo Crumble, All was quiet in the deep dark wood; £1.60 X 3: A mouse took a stroll, Roasted Fox, Owl ice cream?; Miniature sheet of 4 stamps: 1st Class X 2: Owl, Mouse; £1.60 X 2: Snake, Fox.	Rose
578	2019.11.05	Christmas	8 Stamps: Nativity Scenes: 2nd class, 2nd class large, 1st class, 1st class large, £1.35, £1.55, £1.60, £2.30	Charlie Smith Design
xxx	2019.11.18	Lunar Year of the Rat	Generic Sheet. 20 Stamps: 1st class X 20 – different smiler stamps featuring fireworks images	Royal Mail Group Ltd
579	2019.11.26	Star Wars	10 Stamps: 1st class X 10: Count Dooku, Lando Calrissian, Sith Trooper, Jannah, Grand Moff Tarkin, Darth Maul, Zorii Bliss, Wicket Warrick, Poe Dameron, Queen Amidala; 6 Stamps: 1st class X 6: Poes X-wing fighter, Jedi starfighter, Slave 1, TIE silencer, Podracers, Speeder bikes;	Interabang

== Other periods ==
- United Kingdom commemorative stamps 1924–1969
- United Kingdom commemorative stamps 1970–1979
- United Kingdom commemorative stamps 1980–1989
- United Kingdom commemorative stamps 1990–1999
- United Kingdom commemorative stamps 2000–2009
- United Kingdom commemorative stamps 2020–2029

== See also ==
- Stanley Gibbons
- Stamp collecting
- List of people on stamps
- Philately
- Stamps
- PHQ Cards
