= Michael Warren (artist) =

English painter

- Born: 1938 (age 87–88)
- Awards: RSPB Medal and The BIRDscapes Gallery 'Conservation through Art Award'
- Website: www.mikewarren.co.uk

Michael Warren (born 1938, sometimes called Mike) is an English artist, known for painting birds. He has designed several series of commemorative postage stamps and book jackets, as well as publishing books of his own work. His works have also featured on the cover of the RSPB's Birds magazine. He is a member of the Society of Wildlife Artists and the Artists for Nature Foundation.

== Biography ==
Born in 1938, Warren was educated at Wolverhampton Grammar School and Wolverhampton College of Art.

He is particularly associated with the RSPB reserve at Langford Lowfields.

Warren and his wife live in Nottinghamshire. They have two children.

He is president of Nottinghamshire Birdwatchers, the county's ornithological society.

== Postage stamps ==
Warren has designed a number of postage stamps, including:

- 16 January 1980: Centenary of Wild Bird Protection Act, for Royal Mail
- 12 March 1996: 50th Anniversary of Wildfowl & Wetlands Trust, for Royal Mail
- 1990 – 1992: Native & Migratory Birds, for the Republic of the Marshall Islands

He has also painted designs for a number of "duck stamps" for the Audubon Society of the United States.

== Bibliography ==
- —— (1984). Shorelines: Birds at the Water's Edge. Outlet. ISBN 978-0812911336.
- —— (1998). Field Sketches.
- —— (1999). Langford Lowfields 1989-99.
- —— (2001). Le Lac du Borget. Gallimard.
- —— (2007). Images from Birding. Langford Press. ISBN 978-1904078241.
- —— (2012). American Birding Sketchbook. Langford Press. ISBN 978-0812911336.
- —— (2014). Taking Flight: The Birds of Langford Lowfields. Mascot Media. ISBN 978-0957181182.

=== As editor ===
- There and Back: A Celebration of Bird Migration. Andy Brown, Michael Warren (eds.). Langford Press. 2011. ISBN 978-1904078371.

=== As illustrator ===
- Carter, Ian; Powell, Dan (2001). The Red Kite. Arlequin Press. ISBN 9781900159616.

=== Jacket design ===
- Harrison, Graham R.; Dean, Alan R.; Richards, Alan J.; Smallshire, David (1982). The Birds of the West Midlands. West Midland Bird Club. ISBN 0-9507881-0-4.
- Harrison, Graham; Harrison, Janet (2005). The New Birds of the West Midlands. West Midland Bird Club. ISBN 0-9507881-2-0. Archived from the original on 20 September 2011.
