= United Kingdom commemorative stamps 1990–1999 =

Commemorative stamps, postage stamps issued to honour or commemorate a place, event or person, have been released by the United Kingdom since 1924. Several sets were released during the decade of the 1990s.

== History ==
Postage stamps were first used in Great Britain on 6 May 1840, with the introduction of the world's first adhesive postage stamp, the Penny Black. Up until 1924, all British stamps depicted only the portrait of the reigning monarch, with the exception of the 'High Value' stamps, the so-called "Sea Horses" design issued in 1913, which were twice the size of normal stamps with added pictorial design.

In 1924, the first 'Commemorative' stamp was issued for the British Empire Exhibition. There were then occasional issues over the next thirty years, when the frequency of new issues became more regular. From the mid-sixties, in most years, six to nine sets of commemorative stamps have been issued every year. PHQ Cards, postcard sized reproductions of commemorative stamps, have also been issued to accompany every new set of stamps since the mid-seventies.

British Commemorative stamps issued between 1990 and 1999
Issue date	Issue details	Stamps in set	Designer(s)
1990
23 January 1990	150th Anniversary of Royal Society for Prevention of Cruelty to Animals	Four	
6 February 1990	Greetings Stamps "Smiles"	Ten	
6 March 1990	Europa & Glasgow 1990, European City of Culture	Four	
10 April 1990	25th Anniversary of Queen's Award for Export & Technology	Two	
3 May 1990	"Stamp World 90" International Stamp Exhibition, (Miniature Sheet)	One (MS)	
5 June 1990	150th Anniversary of Kew Gardens	Four	
10 July 1990	150th Birth anniversary of Thomas Hardy (Author)	One	
2 August 1990	90th Birthday of Queen Elizabeth The Queen Mother	Four	
11 September 1990	Gallantry Awards	Five	
16 October 1990	Astronomy	Four	J. Fisher
13 November 1990	Christmas	Five	
1991
8 January 1991	Dogs – Paintings by George Stubbs	Five	
5 February 1991	Greetings Stamps "Good Luck"	Ten	
5 March 1991	Scientific Achievements	Four: Charles Babbage (computing), Michael Faraday (electricity), Frank Whittle (jet engine), Robert Watson-Watt (radar).	J Harwood
26 March 1991	Greetings Stamps "Smiles", same set as issued 06/02/90 reprinted, inscribed "1st" instead of "20p"	Ten	
23 April 1991	Europa, Europe in Space	Four	
11 June 1991	World Student Games, Sheffield (22p, 26p & 31p) & Rugby World Cup, London (37p)	Four	
16 July 1991	9th World Congress of Roses, Belfast	Five	
20 August 1991	150th Anniversary of Dinosaur's Identification by Owen	Five	Bryan Kneale
17 September 1991	Bicentenary of Ordnance Survey. Maps of Ham Street, Kent	Four	Howard Brown
12 November 1991	Christmas	Five	
1992
14 January 1992	Wintertime	Five	
28 January 1992	Greetings Stamps "Memories"	Ten	
6 February 1992	40th Anniversary of Accession	Five	
10 March 1992	Death Centenary of Alfred, Lord Tennyson	Four	
7 April 1992	Europa, International Events	Five	
16 June 1992	350th Anniversary of the Civil War	Four	
21 July 1992	150th Anniversary of Sir Arthur Sullivan	Five	
15 September 1992	Protection of the Environment, Children's Paintings	Four	
13 October 1992	Single European Market	One	
10 November 1992	Christmas	Five	
1993
19 January 1993	600th Anniversary of Abbotsbury Swannery	Five	David Gentleman
2 February 1993	Greetings Stamps " Gift Giving"	Ten	
16 February 1993	300th Anniversary of John Harrison, inventor of the marine chronometer	Four	
2 March 1993	£10 Definitive	One	
16 March 1993	14th World Orchid Conference, Glasgow	Five	
11 May 1993	Europa, Contemporary Art	Four	
15 June 1993	Roman Britain	Four	
20 July 1993	Inland Waterways	Four	
14 September 1993	The Four Seasons, Autumn	Five	
12 October 1993	Sherlock Holmes	Five	Andrew Davidson
9 November 1993	Christmas	Five	
1994
18 January 1994	The Age of Steam	Five	
1 February 1994	Greetings Stamps "Messages"	Ten	
1 March 1994	25th Anniversary of Investiture of the Prince of Wales; Paintings by Prince Charles	Five	
12 April 1994	Centenary of Picture Postcards	Four	
3 May 1994	Opening of Channel Tunnel (Joint issue with La Poste)	Four	
6 June 1994	50th anniversary of D-Day	Five	K Bassford
5 July 1994	Scottish Golf Courses	Five	
2 August 1994	The Four Seasons, Summertime	Five	
27 September 1994	Europa, Medical Discoveries	Four	
1 November 1994	Christmas	Five	
1995
17 January 1995	Cats	Five	
14 March 1995	Springtime	Five	
21 March 1995	Greetings Stamps 'Greetings in Art'	Ten	
11 April 1995	Centenary of the National Trust	Five	
2 May 1995	Europa, Peace & Freedom	Five	
6 June 1995	Science Fiction, Novels by H. G. Wells	Four	
8 August 1995	Reconstruction of Shakespeare's Globe Theatre	Five	
5 September 1995	Pioneers of Communication	Four	
3 October 1995	Centenary of Rugby league	Five	
30 October 1995	Christmas	Five	
1996
25 January 1996	Death Bicentenary of Robert Burns	Four	
25 February 1996	Greetings Stamps, Cartoons	Ten	
12 March 1996	50th Anniversary of Wildfowl & Wetlands Trust	Five	
16 April 1996	Centenary of Cinema	Five	
14 May 1996	European Football Championship	Five	H. Brown
9 July 1996	Olympic & Paralympic Games, Atlanta	Five	
6 August 1996	Europa, Famous Women	Five	
3 September 1996	50th Anniversary oc Children's Television	Five	
1 October 1996	Classic Sports Cars	Five	
28 October 1996	Christmas	Five	
1997
6 January 1997	Greetings Stamps, 19th century Flower Paintings	Ten	
21 January 1997	450th Death Anniversary of King Henry VIII	Seven	
11 March 1997	Religious Anniversaries	Four	
21 April 1997	Royal Golden Wedding Gold Definitives, 26p & 1st values	Two	
13 May 1997	Europa, Horror Stories	Four	
10 June 1997	British Aircraft Designers	Five	Turner Duckworth
8 July 1997	"All the Queen's Horses", 50th Anniversary of the British Horse Society	Four	
12 August 1997	Sub-Post Offices	Four	
9 September 1997	Birth Centenary of Enid Blyton	Five	
27 October 1997	Christmas, 150th Anniversary of the Christmas Cracker	Five	
13 November 1997	Royal Golden Wedding	Four	
1998
20 January 1998	Endangered Species	Six	Robert Maude
3 February 1998	Diana, Princess of Wales Commemoration	Five	
24 February 1998	The Queen's Beasts (650th Anniversary of the Order of the Garter)	Five	Jeffrey Matthews FSCD
24 March 1998	Lighthouses	Five	Dick Davis
23 April 1998	Comedians	Five	Gerald Scarfe
23 June 1998	Health (50 Years of the NHS)	Four	Vince Frost
21 July 1998	Magical Worlds (Classic Fantasy Books for Children)	Five	Peter Malone
25 August 1998	Europa. Carnival (Notting Hill Carnival)	Four	Tim Hazael
29 September 1998	Speed (Great British Land Speed Records)	Five	Roundel
2 November 1998	Christmas (Angels)	Five	Irene von Treskow
1999
12 January 1999	The Millennium Series. The Inventor's Tale	Four	David Gentleman
2 February 1999	The Millennium Series. The Traveller's Tale	Four	
2 March 1999	The Millennium Series. The Patient's Tale	Four	
6 April 1999	The Millennium Series. The Settler's Tale	Four	
4 May 1999	The Millennium Series. The Worker's Tale	Four	
1 June 1999	The Millennium Series. The Entertainer's Tale	Four	
15 June 1999	The Wedding of Prince Edward and Sophie Rhys-Jones	Two	John Swannell
6 July 1999	The Millennium Series. The Citizen's Tale	Four	
3 August 1999	The Millennium Series. The Scientist's Tale	Four	
11 August 1999	Solar Eclipse		
7 September 1999	The Millennium Series. The Farmer's Tale	Four	
21 September 1999	World Changers	Charles Darwin, Edward Jenner, Michael Faraday and Alan Turing.	
5 October 1999	The Millennium Series. The Soldier's Tale	Four	
2 November 1999	The Millennium Series. The Christian's Tale	Four	Clare Melinsky
7 December 1999	The Millennium Series. The Artist's Tale	Four	
14 December 1999	The Millennium Series. Millennium Timekeeper	One	David Gentleman

== Other decades ==
- United Kingdom commemorative stamps 1924–1969
- United Kingdom commemorative stamps 1970–1979
- United Kingdom commemorative stamps 1980–1989
- United Kingdom commemorative stamps 2000–2009
- United Kingdom commemorative stamps 2010–2019
- United Kingdom commemorative stamps 2020–2029

== See also ==
- List of people on stamps
- Philately
- PHQ Cards
- Stamp Collecting

== References and sources ==
Notes

Sources

- Stanley Gibbons
- Gibbons Stamp Monthly
- Royal Mail Stamp Guide
- Royal Mail British Philatelic Bulletin
