= Clare Melinsky =

Scottish artist

Clare Melinsky (born 1953) is an artist, printmaker, and illustrator who lives in Scotland. She is particularly known for her linocut illustrations.

== Early life and education ==
Melinsky studied Theatre Design at the Central School of Art and Design.

== Career ==
Melinsky's work has been featured in several sets of commemorative Royal Mail stamps. She has designed book covers for forty Penguin Books Shakespeare editions.

Melinsky provided linocut illustrations for a 2010 set of signature editions of J.K. Rowling's Harry Potter series.

Melinsky also used linocuts to illustrate the poetry collection Poems to Perform, as well as several gardening books. Her linocut images are influenced by artists Edward Bawden and Eric Ravilious, as well as Hanga Japanese prints.
