= Michael Warren (anthropologist) =

Michael W. Warren
- Occupation: Forensic anthropologist

Michael W. Warren is an American associate professor emeritus and forensic anthropologist, at the University of Florida. He formerly served as the William H. Garmany Term Professor of Human Rights & Social Justice in the Department of Anthropology, and as Assistant Director of the William R. Maples Center for Forensic Medicine. Warren is a retired diplomate of the American Board of Forensic Anthropology. He was a board member of the Scientific Working Group for Forensic Anthropology (SWGANTH). He also served as a member of the Forensic Advisory Board of the International Committee for the Red Cross. From 2009 until his retirement, Warren was the director of the C.A. Pound Human Identification Laboratory, the University of Florida's forensic anthropology laboratory. The C.A. Pound Laboratory performs analyses of skeletal remains for many of the 24 medical examiner districts in the State of Florida.

== Background ==
A student of William Maples at the University of Florida, Warren contributed to casework at the C.A. Pound Laboratory for over 26 years, conducting analyses of over 1000 skeletal remains. He has also assisted with personal identification in mass disasters, and helped to identify and document war crimes against the victims of genocide in Bosnia, Serbia and Kosovo. In 2011, he testified in the trial of Casey Anthony regarding the death of Caylee Anthony.

== Research and publications ==
He is an author of the introductory textbook Bare Bones: A Survey of Forensic Anthropology (along with co-authors Nicolette M. Parr, Katie Skorpinski, and Carlos Zambrano). He is an editor of The Forensic Anthropology Laboratory, a volume that includes contributions from Thomas D. Holland, Richard L. Jantz, and other prominent forensic anthropologists (Heather A. Walsh-Heaney and Laurel E. Freas are the volume's other editors). Warren has published over 70 research articles and abstracts in peer-reviewed forensic journals such as the Journal of Forensic Sciences and Forensic Science International. His research interests include human variation, trauma analysis, the effects of cremation on human remains.
