= PHQ card =

First PHQ card issued in 1973 featuring W.G. Grace

PHQ cards are postcards issued by the British Post Office depicting the designs of their commemorative stamps. They are generally available to buy in main post offices about two weeks prior to the release of each new set of stamps.

== Description ==
The 'PHQ' stands for Postal Headquarters. All items published by the Post Office are given a number which is prefixed by letters. The first card issued, on 16 May 1973, was numbered PHQ1, and the numbering sequence has continued to the present day.

There are however two gaps in the sequence, and two duplications. The number PHQ24 was originally set aside for the 9p Silver Jubilee card (issued after the rest of the set), but when it was issued the card was numbered PHQ22E. The next set (Wildlife cards, issued 5 October 1977) had already been allocated the number PHQ25, and so the number PHQ24 was never used.

The London 1980 Exhibition card, issued 9 April 1980 to commemorate the 1980 International Stamp Exhibition, and the set of five cards for London Landmarks, issued 7 May 1980, both had the reference number PHQ43.

The set of five cards for Gallantry, issued 11 September 1990, and the set of four cards for Astronomy, issued 16 October 1990, both had the reference number PHQ129. Consequently, the number PHQ130 was unused.

== History ==
The first card issued was the 3p W.G. Grace stamp from the set of stamps commemorating County Cricket, issued on 16 May 1973, but not released until mid-July. Subsequent cards have been issued about two weeks prior to the release of the stamps. This enables collectors to obtain the cards before the issue of the stamps so that they can attach the relevant stamp and obtain First Day of Issue postmarks.

When they were first issued, the PHQ cards were intended to be just an occasional picture postcard for sale to the public at Post Offices and Philatelic Counters. However, right from the first card issued, some enterprising Stamp Dealers realised that there was a potential new stamp collecting area, and stamps were fixed either to the face of the card, or the back, and postmarks for various cricket matches played between July and September 1973 were obtained.

In August 1973 a second card was issued for one of the stamps in the set to mark the 400th anniversary of the birth of Inigo Jones, architect and designer. Over the next three years several more single cards, and a few sets were issued, from July 1976 onwards there has been a set of cards issued for every new set of commemorative stamps that has been issued.

The first two cards issued, 1973 Cricket and 1973 Inigo Jones, are larger than the current cards, measuring 120 mm x 172 mm in size, while all cards issued from PHQ3 onward are 104 mm x 148 mm in size. This can be confusing for new collectors coming across the first two issues for the first time, if they are not aware of the size difference, they tend to think they are worthless copies.

== Sources ==
- Stanley Gibbons Concise Stamp Catalogue
- Collect Post Office Cards (Published by Rosendale Stamps)
- Gibbons Stamp Monthly
- Royal Mail Stamp GuideRoyal Mail British Philatelic Bulletin
