= Airports of London =

Airports serving London, England

London's six international airports

The metropolitan area of London, England is served by six international airports and several smaller airports. Together, these airports constitute the busiest airport system in the world by passenger numbers and the second-busiest by aircraft movements. IATA airport code shared by all airports in the metropolitan area is LON.

In 2024, the six airports handled a total of more than 177 million passengers. The London airports handle over 60% of all the UK's air traffic. The airports serve a total of 14 domestic destinations and 396 international destinations.

== International airports ==
International airports in the London airport system
| Airport | Airport codes | | Passengers (2024) | Cargo (tonnes) | Aircraft movements | Distance to Central London |
| Airport | IATA | ICAO | Passengers (2024) | Cargo (tonnes) | Aircraft movements | Distance to Central London |
|---|---|---|---|---|---|---|
| Heathrow | LHR | EGLL | 83,900,000 | 1,484,351 | 475,176 | 26 km (16 mi) |
| Gatwick | LGW | EGKK | 43,200,000 | 88,085 | 256,987 | 45 km (28 mi) |
| Stansted | STN | EGSS | 29,760,000 | 202,593 | 143,511 | 63 km (39 mi) |
| Luton | LTN | EGGW | 16,940,000 | 27,905 | 96,797 | 55 km (34 mi) |
| City | LCY | EGLC | 3,570,000 | – | 70,781 | 14 km (9 mi) |
| Southend | SEN | EGMC | 288,000 | 6 | 27,715 | 64 km (40 mi) |
| Total | —N/a | —N/a | 177,660,000 | 1,802,939 | 1,070,967 | —N/a |

=== City (LCY) ===
Located in the London Borough of Newham, London City Airport^{map5} is situated in London's Docklands, four miles from Canary Wharf, and is the closest airport to central London, which limits its size—the airport has a single runway, which is very short. Furthermore, the airport has a steep approach at a 5.5° angle (as opposed to the usual 3 degrees). As a result, only the smallest aircraft are permitted to use the airport, which initially prevented all long-haul flights. However, from 2009 to 2020, British Airways had operated a flight to New York–JFK, via Shannon, using an Airbus A318 – the largest aircraft that can be handled at the airport. The largest aircraft currently operating from the airport is the Airbus A220-100, slightly smaller than the Airbus A318, with increased range and capable of taking off from London City fully loaded. Its first commercial flight completed in August 2017 from Zürich.

The airport is often used by business travellers, with many flights serving destinations across the UK and northern Europe. The airport cannot easily be expanded due to the docks on either side. It is also the only airport serving London which does not operate at night.

A light rail service from London City Airport DLR station, which adjoins the terminal building of London City Airport, links it (among many other stations) to the financial district of the City of London at Bank and Monument stations, which offer interchanges with London Underground.

=== Heathrow (LHR) ===
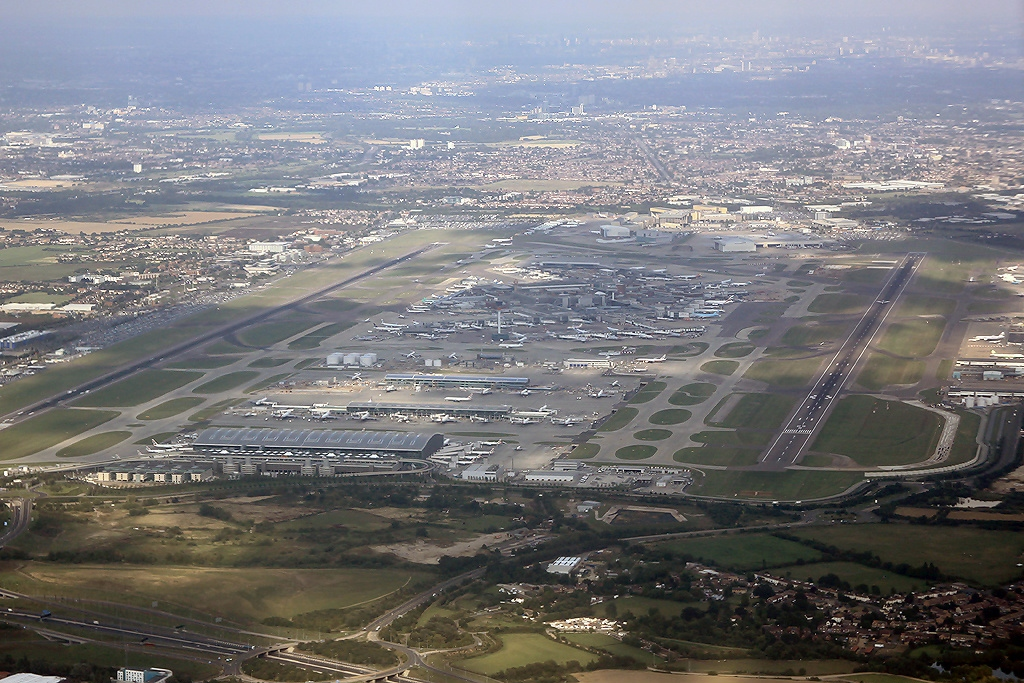
London Heathrow is the busiest airport in the UK and in Europe and one of the busiest in the world.

Located in the London Borough of Hillingdon, Heathrow^{map1} is by far the largest of London's airports and considered the main gateway into the United Kingdom for non-European visitors. Heathrow has four terminals and two parallel runways. Due to the location in London's western suburbs, Heathrow has had trouble trying to expand, with various expansion projects being cancelled. As a result, the airport consistently runs at over 99% capacity and is often included on lists of the worst-rated airports in the world. However, on 1 July 2015 Heathrow's expansion plan was suggested as the best option by the Airport Commission and on 25 October 2016 a new northwest runway and terminal was approved by the Government.

The airport is connected to Great Britain's motorway network via the M4 and M25 motorways, to London Paddington station by Heathrow Express and Elizabeth line trains and to other Central London destinations by London Underground trains on the Piccadilly line.

In April 2012 (before the 2012 Summer Olympics), Heathrow announced that for the first time in history it handled 70 million passengers in a calendar year, making it the third busiest airport in the world in terms of passenger numbers, after Atlanta and Beijing–Capital. It also comes second behind Dubai–International in the busiest airport in the world in terms of international passenger numbers, as well as being the busiest airport in Europe by total passenger numbers.

Heathrow serves six continents around the world, and is the base for the flag carrier British Airways in Terminal 5. While it also serves short-haul flights, Heathrow is London's long-distance hub and is the most popular arrival point for flights from the United States of America (including New York–JFK), with 13 million passengers. However, because it is operating at capacity, Heathrow has been unable to increase service to cities in the newly industrialised countries such as China, falling behind European bases like Frankfurt, Amsterdam, and Paris–Charles de Gaulle.

=== Gatwick (LGW) ===
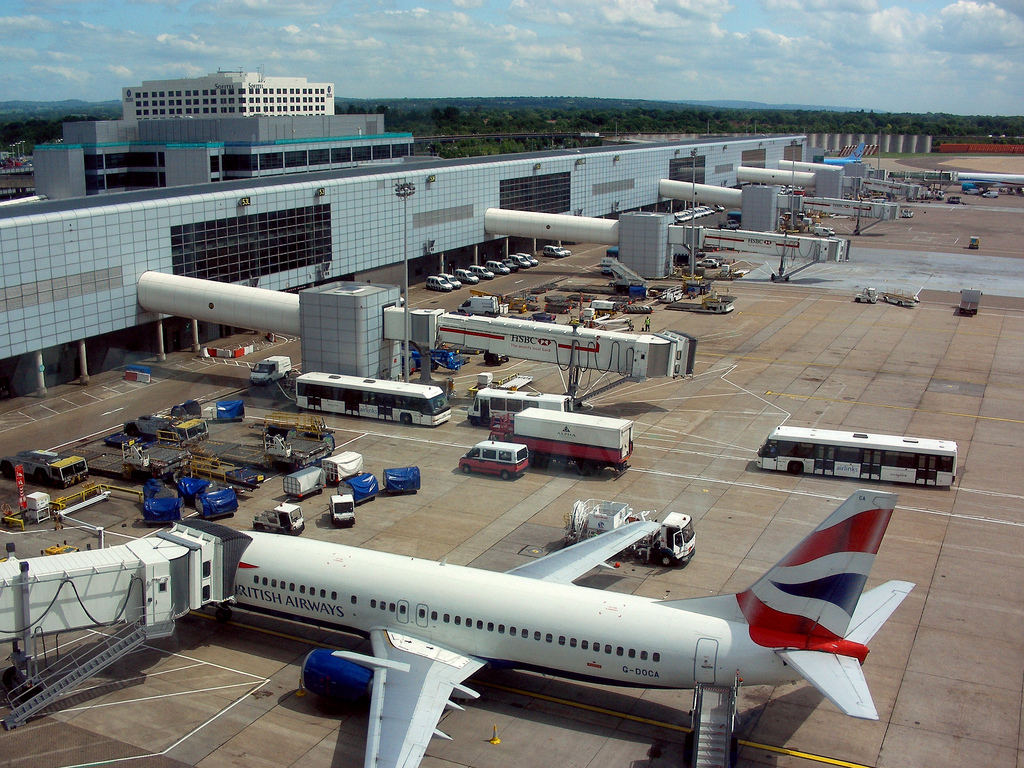
Side view of the North Terminal of Gatwick Airport

Located in West Sussex, Gatwick^{map2} is the second-busiest airport in the United Kingdom and the eighth-busiest in Europe. It handles flights to more destinations than any other UK airport and is the main base of easyJet, the UK's largest airline by number of passengers. Also using it as a base are British Airways, Norse Atlantic Airways, TUI Airways and Wizz Air.

The airport has two terminals, North and South. It is connected to the motorway network via the M23 and has its own railway station, with Southern and Thameslink trains serving London Victoria and London Bridge stations respectively, as well as the dedicated Gatwick Express shuttle to and from London Victoria.

=== Luton (LTN) ===
Located in Bedfordshire, Luton Airport^{map4} is London's fourth-busiest and fourth-largest airport, after Gatwick and Heathrow and Stansted Airports and the fourth-closest to central London, after City and Gatwick and Heathrow Airports. The two airlines supplying most passenger capacity are the low-cost carriers, easyJet and Wizz Air.

Luton Airport Parkway railway station can be reached from London St Pancras in as little as 22 minutes via East Midlands Railway, while Thameslink is the primary operator, with slower but more frequent services. An automated people mover transit system, Luton DART, connects Luton Airport Parkway to the airport, a distance of just over a mile.

=== Stansted (STN) ===
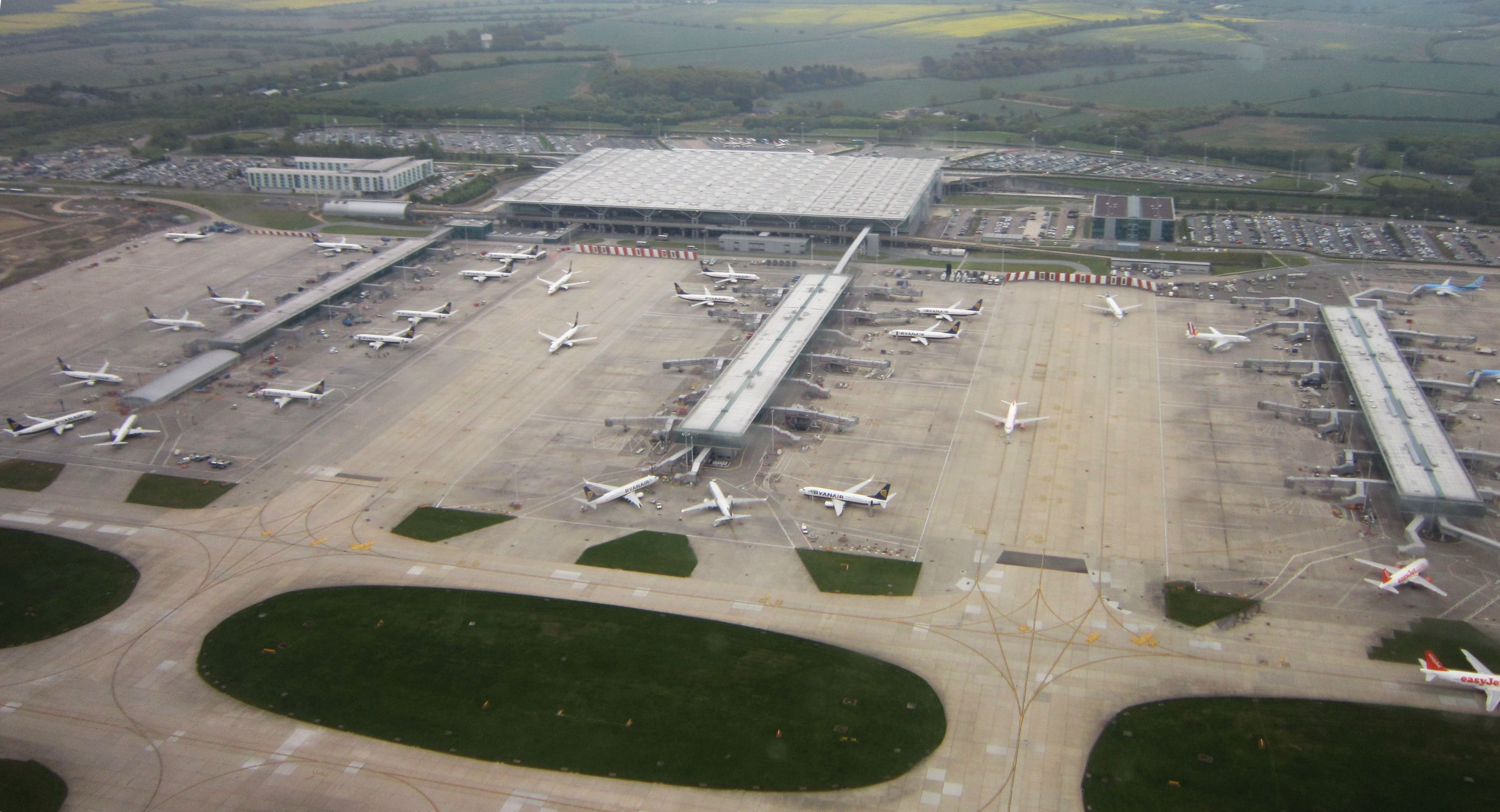
Aerial view of the main terminal and the satellite buildings of London Stansted Airport

Located in Essex, Stansted^{map3} is London's third-busiest airport and is the fourth-busiest airport in the United Kingdom, behind Gatwick, Heathrow and Manchester Airports. It is the 22nd-busiest airport in Europe and the largest operational base for Ryanair, which is Europe's largest low-cost carrier and the world's largest international airline by number of international passengers. Stansted serves more scheduled European destinations than any other airport in the UK, as well as some destinations further afield. It is the home of Air Harrods, operated by Harrods Aviation,. Stansted is considered particularly suitable for use by VIPs, such as Air Force One carrying the President of the United States, Barack Obama, in 2009 and also 2016, also President Donald Trump in 2017, 2019 and 2025.

Stansted Airport railway station is situated in the terminal building directly below the main concourse. Services to Central London are on the Stansted Express train to and from London Liverpool Street. The airport is also served by shuttle bus services to various London destinations.

=== Southend (SEN) ===
Located in Essex, Southend Airport^{map6} expanded commercial air transport operations to destinations in Ireland in 2011, and to mainland Europe in 2012 when easyJet commenced operations using the brand new terminal and railway station. Southend Airport claims it only takes 15 minutes to go through arrivals from plane to train with hand luggage. It was the third-busiest airport in London from the 1960s until the end of the 1970s, when it was overtaken in passenger numbers by London Stansted Airport.

Southend Airport railway station is served by Greater Anglia trains, which connect the airport to London Liverpool Street station up to 8 times per hour. The journey to London takes about one hour.

=== Other airports ===
Although they are not London airports, Birmingham Airport and Southampton Airport have been suggested as alternative airports for London due to the existence of direct rail links serving Central London. Birmingham Airport has argued that High Speed 2, once complete, would make it an attractive option for London passengers.

== Other civil airports ==
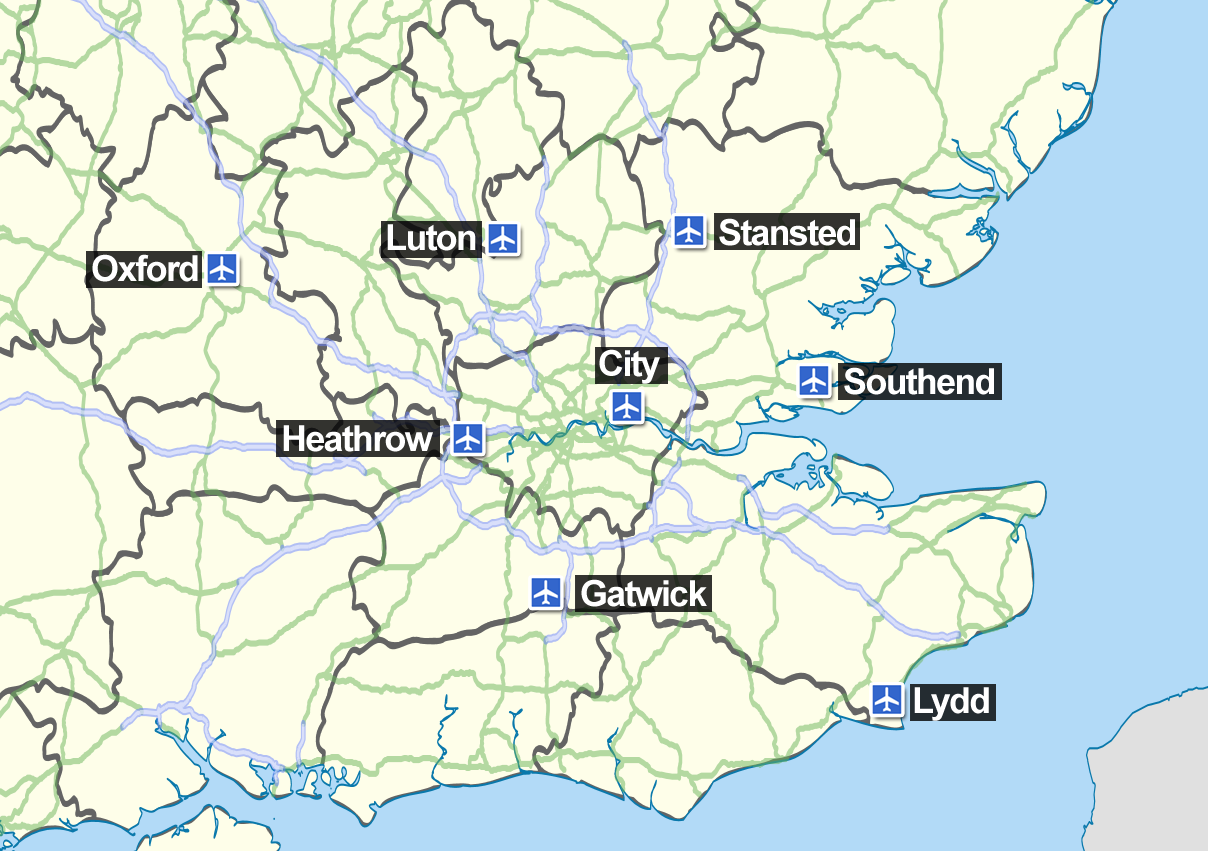
Locations of OXF, LHR, LTN, LGW, LCY, STN, SEN and LYX

A number of other airports also serve the London area.

=== Open airports ===
The following are mainly used by general aviation flights.

- London Biggin Hill Airport^{map7}, in the London Borough of Bromley
- Blackbushe Airport^{map8}, in Hampshire
- Damyns Hall Aerodrome^{map9}, in the London Borough of Havering
- Denham Aerodrome^{map10}, in Buckinghamshire
- Elstree Airfield^{map11}, in Hertfordshire
- Fairoaks Airport^{map12}, in Surrey
- Andrewsfield Aerodrome in Essex
- Farnborough Airport^{map13}, in Hampshire
- London Heliport^{map14}, in Battersea, Wandsworth
- Lydd Airport (London Ashford Airport)^{map15}, in Kent
- North Weald Airfield^{map16}, in Essex
- London Oxford Airport^{map17}, in Oxfordshire
- Redhill Aerodrome^{map19}, in Surrey
- Rochester Airport^{map20}, in Kent
- Stapleford Aerodrome^{map21}, in Essex
- White Waltham Airfield^{map22}, in Berkshire
- Wycombe Air Park^{map23}, in Buckinghamshire

=== Closed airports ===
Airports are listed at their current borough, although the area may have been outside London at the time of construction.

- Panshanger Aerodrome^{map18}, in Hertfordshire
- Cricklewood Aerodrome^{map24}, in the London Borough of Barnet
- Croydon Airport^{map25}, in the London Borough of Croydon
- Great West Aerodrome^{map26}, in the London Borough of Hillingdon
- Hendon Aerodrome^{map27}, in the London Borough of Barnet (now the site of the Royal Air Force Museum)
- Heston Aerodrome^{map28}, in the London Borough of Hounslow
- Hounslow Heath Aerodrome^{map29}, in the London Borough of Hounslow
- London Air Park (Hanworth Air Park)^{map30}, in the London Borough of Hounslow
- Stag Lane Aerodrome^{map31}, in the London Borough of Barnet

== Royal Air Force stations ==
There were several Royal Air Force stations in London. This list excludes those that are classed as non-flying stations.

=== Operational ===
- RAF Northolt^{map32}, in the London Borough of Hillingdon, also handles civil flights

=== Non-operational ===
Station are listed at their current borough, although the area may have been outside London at the time of construction.

- RAF Biggin Hill^{map7}, in the London Borough of Bromley
- RAF Fairlop^{map33}, in the London Borough of Redbridge
- RAF Hendon^{map27}, in the London Borough of Barnet
- RAF Heston^{map28}, in the London Borough of Hounslow
- RAF Hornchurch^{map34}, in the London Borough of Havering
- RAF Kenley^{map35}, in the London Borough of Croydon
- RAF St Pancras^{map36}, in the London Borough of Camden

== Proposed airports ==
=== Roskill Commission ===
The Roskill Commission in 1971 short-listed four locations for a third London airport: Cublington, Foulness, Nuthampstead and Thurleigh. Cublington to the north-west of London was the final recommendation but the UK government rejected it in favour of Foulness (later known as Maplin Sands) in Essex. The airport plan was shelved after the 1973 oil crisis.

=== Thames Estuary ===
Due to London's airports, particularly Heathrow, operating at full capacity, Boris Johnson, London's former mayor and former UK Prime Minister, and Sir Norman Foster historically proposed a new airport, either on a man-made island in the Thames Estuary, or on the Isle of Grain in north Kent. Foster's proposed Thames Hub Airport would have been very similar to the design of Hong Kong International Airport and Qatar's Hamad International Airport. The plans to have an airport able to handle 110 million passengers a year would have required the closure of Heathrow, and probably have made the new airport the busiest in the world.

The plans met with opposition from some people living nearby, warning the airport would cause a significant increase in bird strikes. Some other people and local businesses, recognising the depressed levels of economic activity in north Kent, were supportive and argued that London needed a new airport in order to be able to compete in the world.

Given its position east of London, this airport would have been less accessible than Heathrow from most parts of central and southern England.

== Traffic and statistics ==
=== Passengers numbers ===
Airports of London passenger totals, 2004–2014 (millions)
Updated: 28 April 2015.
Heathrow, Gatwick, Stansted, Luton, City, Southend

=== Cargo numbers ===
Statistics from 1990 to 2011

=== Change ===
| Year | Aircraft movements | Percentage change | Passenger numbers | Percentage change | Cargo tonnes | Percentage change |
|---|---|---|---|---|---|---|
| 2001 | 1,074,773 | ▼1 | 113,790,381 | ▼2 | 1,649,437 | |
| 2002 | 954,570 | ▼11.2 | 117,138,188 | ▲2.9 | 1,682,693 | ▲2.0 |
| 2003 | 967,270 | ▲1.3 | 120,493,239 | ▲2.9 | 1,667,803 | ▼0.9 |
| 2004 | 1,005,256 | ▲3.8 | 128,933,753 | ▲7.0 | 1,795,326 | ▲7.6 |
| 2005 | 1,038,241 | ▲3.2 | 133,836,827 | ▲3.8 | 1,788,671 | ▼0.4 |
| 2006 | 1,060,831 | ▲5.4 | 137,192,958 | ▲2.5 | 1,717,360 | ▼4.0 |
| 2007 | 1,087,703 | ▲2.5 | 139,950,593 | ▲2.0 | 1,724,040 | ▲0.4 |
| 2008 | 1,077,448 | ▼0.9 | 137,106,041 | ▼2.0 | 1,743,028 | ▲1.1 |
| 2009 | 1,003,616 | ▼6.9 | 130,307,938 | ▼5.0 | 1,563,783 | ▼10.3 |
| 2010 | 954,371 | ▼4.9 | 127,353,419 | ▼2.3 | 1,808,005 | ▲15.6 |
| 2011 | 1,072,126 | ▲12.4 | 133,709,327 | ▲5.0 | 1,802,939 | ▼0.3 |
| 2012 | 1,060,967 | ▼1.0 | 134,914,412 | ▲0.9 | 1,805,761 | ▲0.2 |
| 2013 | 1,067,992 | ▲0.7 | 139,652,261 | ▲3.5 | 1,760,690 | ▼2.5 |
| 2014 | 1,098,605 | ▲2.9 | 146,631,158 | ▲5.0 | 1,819,587 | ▲3.3 |

=== Busiest routes ===
In total, there were 30 international destinations from London, and another three domestic routes, that handled more than 1 million passengers in 2011:

| Destination | Passengers |
|---|---|
| Dublin, Ireland | 3,705,696 |
| Amsterdam, Netherlands | 3,026,082 |
| New York–JFK, United States | 2,700,613 |
| Dubai–International, United Arab Emirates | 2,506,613 |
| Madrid, Spain | 2,496,921 |
| İstanbul–Atatürk, Turkey | 2,376,284 |
| Geneva, Switzerland | 2,218,593 |
| Málaga, Spain | 1,814,682 |
| Frankfurt, Germany | 1,678,536 |
| Barcelona, Spain | 1,661,301 |
| Copenhagen, Denmark | 1,656,818 |
| Zürich, Switzerland | 1,642,959 |
| Munich, Germany | 1,546,441 |
| Rome–Fiumicino, Italy | 1,530,810 |
| Paris–Charles de Gaulle, France | 1,526,030 |
| Hong Kong, Hong Kong | 1,412,749 |
| Alicante, Spain | 1,302,237 |
| Los Angeles, United States | 1,299,118 |
| Chicago–O'Hare, United States | 1,207,424 |
| Newark, United States | 1,197,847 |
| Palma de Mallorca, Spain | 1,189,761 |
| Toronto–Pearson, Canada | 1,186,783 |
| Faro, Portugal | 1,186,358 |
| Stockholm–Arlanda, Sweden | 1,185,848 |
| Budapest, Hungary | 1,145,011 |
| Nice, France | 1,134,396 |
| Singapore, Singapore | 1,069,706 |
| Lisbon, Portugal | 1,069,055 |
| Boston, United States | 1,031,320 |
| Delhi, India | 1,003,598 |

Heathrow Airport is a major hub for flights across the North Atlantic. In 2011, 11% of all north Atlantic flights originated or terminated at Heathrow, more than Paris and Frankfurt combined, and Heathrow is the European terminus for 11 of the 25 busiest north Atlantic routes.

The busiest long-haul route in the world is between London (Heathrow and Gatwick) and New York (JFK and Newark), with a total of 3,898,460 passengers travelling between the two cities in 2011.

== Maps ==
- ^map1Heathrow, 51°28′39″N 000°27′41″W
- ^map2Gatwick, 51°08′53″N 000°11′25″W
- ^map3Stansted, 51°53′06″N 000°14′06″E
- ^map4Luton, 51°52′28″N 000°22′06″W
- ^map5City, 51°30′19″N 000°03′19″E
- ^map6Southend, 51°34′13″N 000°41′36″E
- ^map7Biggin Hill, 51°18′51″N 000°01′47″E
- ^map8Blackbushe, 51°19′26″N 000°50′51″W
- ^map9Damyns Hall, 51°34′43″N 000°14′44″E
- ^map10Denham, 51°35′18″N 000°30′47″W
- ^map11Elstree, 51°39′21″N 000°19′33″W
- ^map12Fairoaks, 51°20′53″N 000°33′31″W
- ^map13Farnborough, 51°16′31″N 000°46′39″W
- ^map14Heliport, 51°28′12″N 000°10′46″W
- ^map15Lydd, 50°57′22″N 000°56′21″E
- ^map16North Weald, 51°43′18″N 000°09′15″E
- ^map17Oxford, 51°50′13″N 001°19′21″W
- ^map18Panshanger, 51°48′07″N 000°09′30″W
- ^map19Redhill, 51°12′49″N 000°08′19″W
- ^map20Rochester, 51°21′07″N 000°30′10″E
- ^map21Stapleford, 51°39′09″N 000°09′22″E
- ^map22White Waltham, 51°30′03″N 000°46′28″W
- ^map23Wycombe, 51°36′42″N 000°48′30″W
- ^map24Cricklewood, 51°33′47″N 000°12′47″W
- ^map25Croydon, 51°21′23″N 000°07′02″W
- ^map26Great West, 51°28′39″N 000°27′41″W
- ^map27Hendon, 51°36′00″N 000°14′46″W
- ^map28Heston, 51°29′15″N 000°23′00″W
- ^map29Hounslow Heath, 51°27′41″N 000°23′20″W
- ^map30London Air Park, 51°26′18″N 000°23′45″W
- ^map31Stag Lane, 51°35′49″N 000°16′26″W
- ^map32RAF Northolt, 51°33′11″N 000°25′06″W
- ^map33RAF Fairlop, 51°36′16″N 000°06′10″E
- ^map34RAF Hornchurch, 51°32′19″N 000°12′17″E
- ^map35RAF Kenley, 51°18′12″N 000°05′41″W
- ^map36RAF St Pancras, 51°32′01″N 000°07′29″W
- ^map37RAF Uxbridge, 51°32′29″N 000°28′19″W

== See also ==
- Transport in London
- List of airports in the United Kingdom and the British Crown Dependencies
- List of cities with more than one commercial airport
