= Just Collecting =

Just Collecting (UK) Ltd (Companies House number: 13775962) is a British private limited company incorporated on 1 December 2021 and registered in Bristol, England. The company operates two principal trading brands: Paul Fraser Collectibles, a high-end dealer in rare collectibles, and Just Collecting Auctions, a specialist philatelic and collectibles auction house. Its founder is Paul Fraser. Just Collecting has been involved in high-profile memorabilia sales in multiple collecting sectors and has offered for sale what it claims to be the "most valuable collection of GB stamps" available for sale.

== Paul Fraser Collectibles ==
Paul Fraser Collectibles was founded in 2009. It is the group's primary retail and private-treaty trading brand.

The company specialises in:

- Rare postage stamps
- Rare British and ancient coins
- Historical manuscripts, artefacts, and documents
- Autographs and signatures
- Space and aviation memorabilia
- Movie and rock & pop memorabilia
- Luxury watches

The business operates from offices in Bristol, UK, and St. Helier, Jersey, Channel Islands.

Notable items handled by the company have included: A 1544 Latin parchment signed by Henry VIII. Personal property belonging to Fidel Castro and Che Guevara, sourced from the estate of Natty Revuelta Clews, Castro's former mistress. A lock of King Charles III’s hair.

== Just Collecting Auctions ==
Just Collecting Auctions is the group's dedicated auction house, specialising in rare British, Commonwealth, Chinese, and worldwide postage stamps, as well as broader collectibles categories. It conducts both online and live in-person auction events, principally from Jersey, Channel Islands. The company's first auction was held in October 2025 and focused on GB and Chinese stamps.
