= Daily Mail Trans-Atlantic Air Race =

Air race between London, UK and New York City, USA

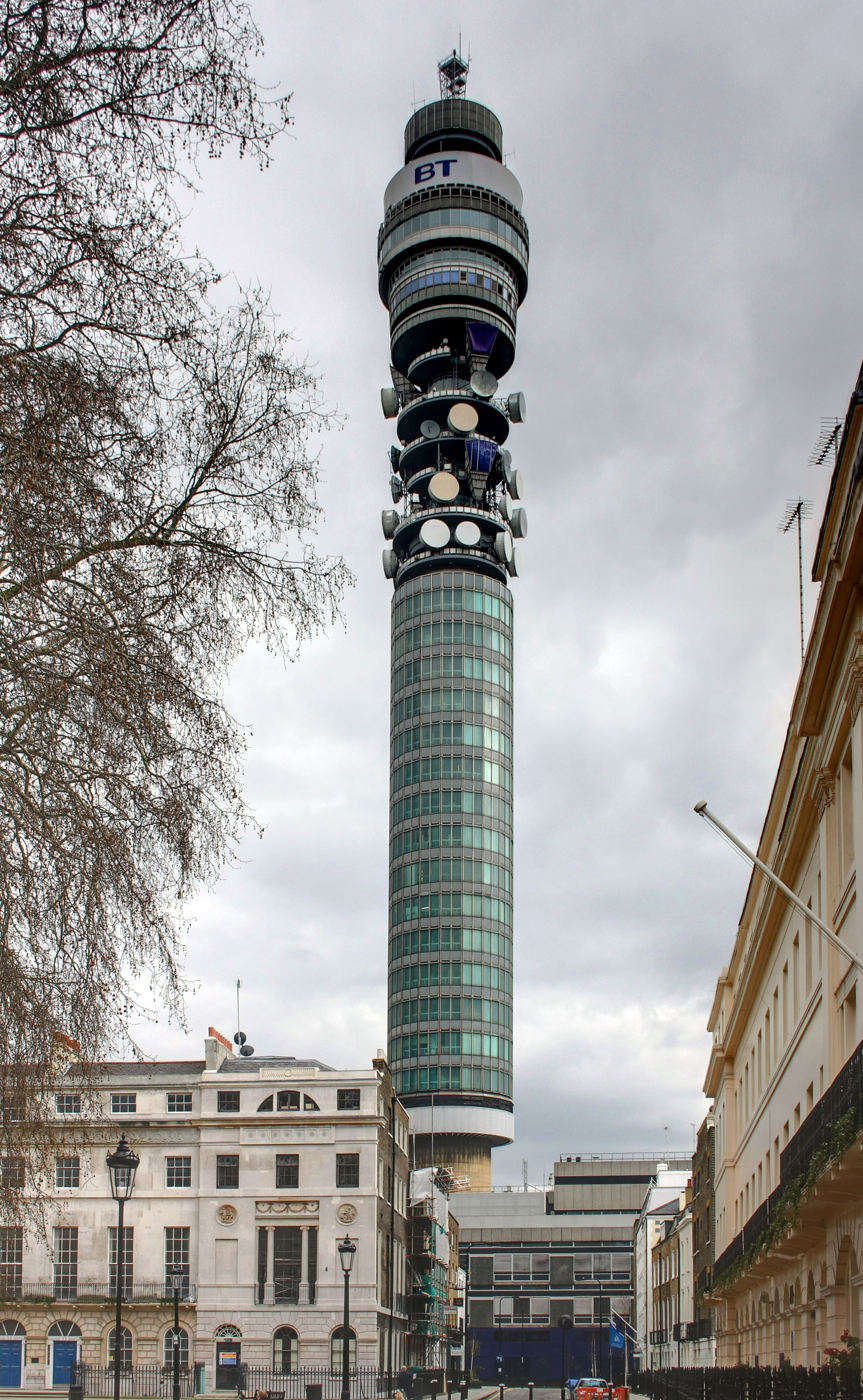
Post Office Tower

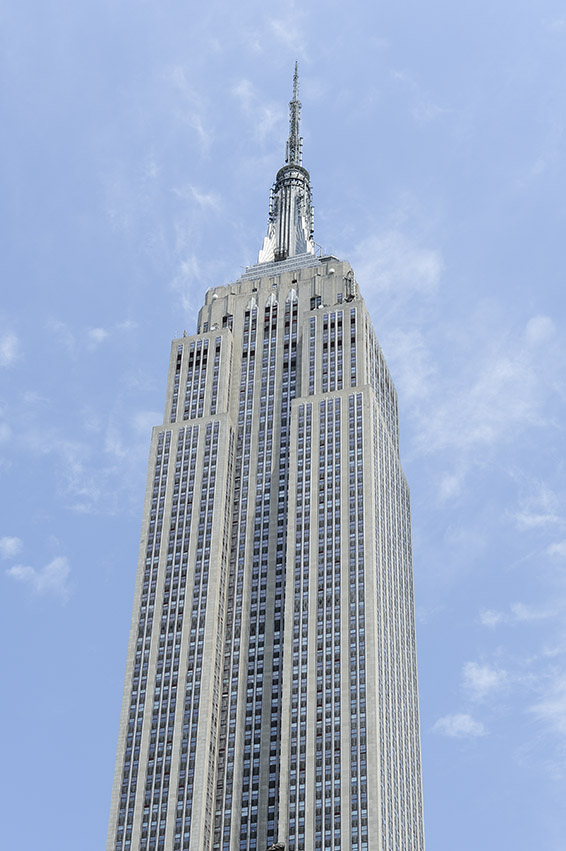
Empire State Building

Starting and ending points of the Daily Mail Trans-Atlantic Air Race between London and New York

The Daily Mail Trans-Atlantic Air Race was a two-way race between London, UK and New York City, USA in 1969 to commemorate the 50th Anniversary of the first trans-atlantic crossing by John Alcock and Arthur Brown.

== The race ==
Organised by the Daily Mail newspaper, the race was held between 4 and 11 May 1969, although named an air race it was actually a race of individuals between the Post Office Tower in London to the Empire State Building in New York. Each of the individuals or "Runners" had to use some form of air transport. With a number of different categories a total of 21 prizes could be won. These included separate categories for the westbound (London to New York) and eastbound (New York to London) directions. A number of point-to-point world records for aircraft were broken.

The shortest overall time from London to New York was by Squadron Leader Tom Lecky-Thompson flying a Royal Air Force Hawker Siddeley Harrier in 6 hours 11 minutes. The shortest time from New York to London was by Lieutenant Commander Peter Goddard, a passenger in a Royal Navy McDonnell Douglas Phantom (callsign 'Royal Blue 3', serial XT859) in 5 hours 12 minutes.

== Civilian competitors ==
The first civil competitor to leave London was Anne Alcock, the niece of Sir John Alcock. She was designated as a licensed mail carrier for the event in order to carry a letter from John Stonehouse (British Postmaster General) to Winton M. Blount (United States Postmaster General), just like Alcock and Brown carried mail on their flight in 1919. Alcock was followed by a number of other notable runners including Sir Billy Butlin, Clement Freud, Stirling Moss, Mary Rand, and Prince Michael of Kent. English aviator Sheila Scott piloted her own aircraft.

== Military competitors ==
=== Royal Navy ===
External image
- Flight crews of the Royal Navy involved in the race
- Teams entered by Royal Navy from Fleet Air Arm Officers' Association

The Royal Navy entered three "runners" each to be flown eastbound across the Atlantic in a McDonnell Douglas Phantom. The navy runners used Phantoms which flew from the Floyd Bennett Naval Air Station to Wisley Aerodrome and were refuelled by Handley Page Victor tankers over the ocean. Radar coverage for the rendezvous of the Phantoms with the tankers over the mid-Atlantic was provided by the HMS Nubian. In New York City, the runners used a helicopter to travel between the airfield in Brooklyn and the West 30th Street Heliport in Manhattan; a motorcycle was used to travel between the heliport and the Empire State Building. In England, a helicopter was used to travel between Wisley Aerodrome and a temporary helipad near the Post Office Tower. The Royal Navy did not operate any supersonic flights in the westbound direction from London to New York.

On 11 May 1969 a Royal Navy F-4K Phantom of 892 Naval Air Squadron set a new world speed record between New York and London in 4 hours and 46 minutes. The flights by the Phantoms broke the record three times during the competition. The first eastbound flight from New York to London was flown by Phantom FG.1 XT860 on 4 May 1969 in 5 hours and 3 minutes and the second flight was made by XT861 on 7 May 1969 in 4 hours and 53 minutes. The jets broke a record that had been previously set in 1958 by a Stratotanker operated by the United States Air Force.

The Vickers Alcock and Brown trophy was awarded to Lieutenant Commander Peter Goddard for his 5 hour 11 minute crossing which was the fastest West to East crossing.

=== Royal Air Force ===
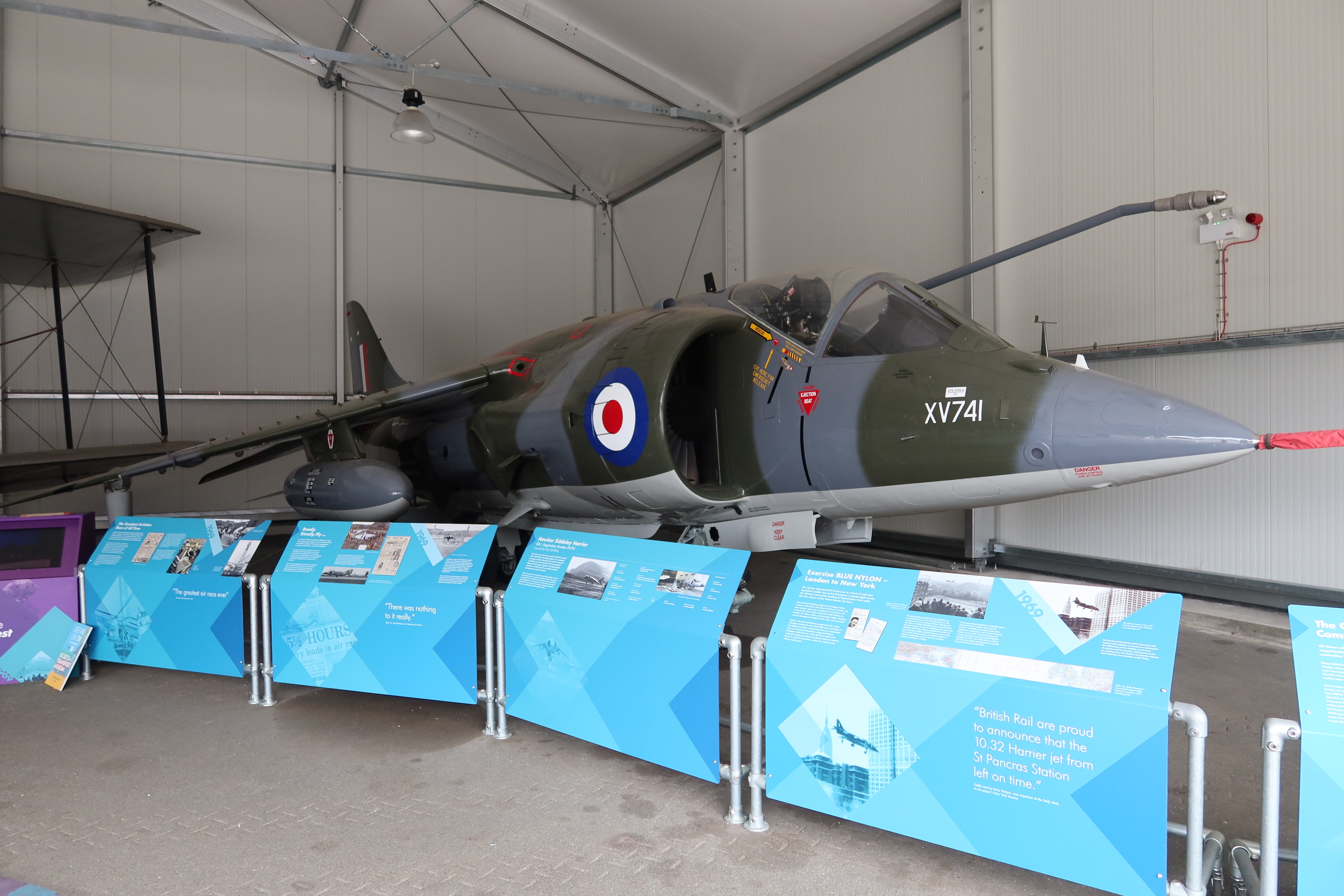
GR.1 XV741 on display at the Brooklands Museum

External image
- Harrier XV741 landing at St Pancras
- Harrier GR.1 landing at St Pancras from Royal Air Force Museum

The Royal Air Force decided to use the unique vertical take-off and landing (VTOL) capability of the Hawker Siddeley Harrier. The decision to use the Harrier was made at the beginning of 1969 whilst the aircraft was still undergoing testing at Boscombe Down; the aircraft was not scheduled to enter service until 1 April 1969. Mike Adams was selected to be the lead pilot for the race, but was injured before the competition when the nosewheel collapsed on a Harrier he was testing. Apart from Lecky-Thompson, the only other person qualified on the Harrier at the time was Squadron Leader Graham Williams, who was originally supposed to be a reserve pilot.

The Harrier's VTOL capability could provide an advantage in the race by allowing it to take-off and land closer to start and finish lines, provided that suitable landing could be obtained in the city centres near the Post Office Tower and Empire State Building. For take-off in London, the Harrier used a coal yard next to St Pancras station, which was temporarily designated as RAF St Pancras. For landing in New York, it used a platform that had been constructed for the planned site of the United Nations International School (UNIS) at Bristol Basin on the East River, using a 29-by-29-metre (96 by 96 ft) landing pad that had been set up by the United States Marine Corps. A helicopter was used for the trip in London between the Post Office Tower and St Pancras station and a motorcycle was used for the trip across Manhattan between the waterfront landing site and the Empire State Building. Like the Royal Navy, the Royal Air Force used Handley Page Victor tankers to refuel its aircraft over the Atlantic. The Harriers employed ferry wing tips to improve their cruising performance.

The westbound flight from London to New York was flown with GR.1 XV741, which is now displayed at the Brooklands Museum in Surrey. The eastbound flight was flown with GR.1 XV744, which is now displayed at the Tangmere Military Aviation Museum in West Sussex. The westbound trip flown by Lecky-Thompson had been completed on 5 May 1969 and the eastbound flight was piloted by Williams on 9 May 1969. The week before the race, Lecky-Thompson had flown XV744 from RAF Northolt to Floyd Bennett Field as a practice run and also to position another aircraft in New York for the eastbound leg of the race (XV741 would serve as the spare for the New York to London flight).

Both of the Harriers joined in the salute to the Queen Elizabeth 2 when she arrived in New York Harbour on her maiden voyage on 7 May 1969 and hovered on each side of the ocean liner. The pilots had learned about the ship's arrival from news on a television in a Manhattan pub the day before and didn't want the ship's arrival to draw attention from their participation in the race, so they devised a plan to meet the ship when she was passing through The Narrows. They obtained local clearances for their planned flight but decided to skip getting approval from the Royal Air Force because they assumed their request would be declined.

On the eastbound leg of the race from New York to London, Williams was driven by a Jaguar E-Type from the Empire State Building to the take-off location on the East River. He attributed getting caught in several red traffic lights in Manhattan on the way to the Harrier as costing him valuable time in the race. Williams decided to leave on a rainy day with poor visibility—when Kennedy Airport was closed due to the weather conditions—because time was running out in the race. When he arrived at the Harrier to prepare for take-off, several officials tried to prevent him from flying because of the weather. Bill Bedford, the former chief test pilot for Hawker Siddeley and the sales director for the aircraft manufacturer, kept a Federal Aviation Administration officer engaged in conversation long enough for Williams to start the engine and take-off before they could stop him. Upon landing at St Pancras, he was carried on a motorcycle and helicopter to the finish line at the Post Office Tower.

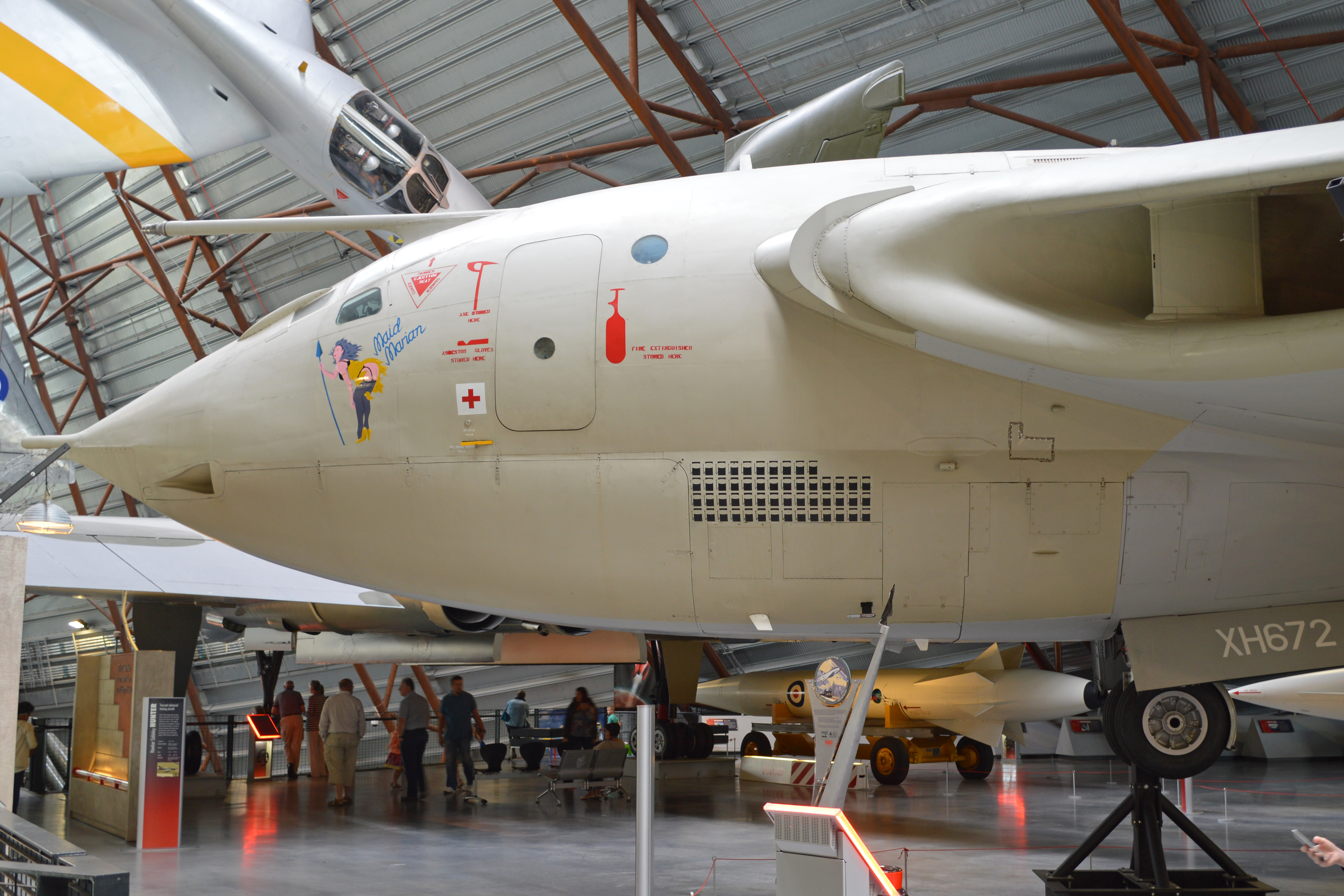
K.2 XH672 on display at the RAF Museum Midlands

No. 543 Squadron RAF also had two Handley Page Victor reconnaissance bombers flying in the competition. Flight lieutenant Derek Aldous was a passenger on Victor B.2 XH672, which flew from Floyd Bennett Field to Wisley Aerodrome with two extra fuel tanks in the bomb bay. He had an overall finishing time of 5 hours 49 minutes, the leading time for subsonic travel between New York and London, and beat Williams' time with the Harrier by just 29.71 seconds. XH672 was subsequently converted into a tanker and is now displayed at the Royal Air Force Museum Midlands in Cosford.

The two Victors carried four 68-kilogram (150 lb) crates of postage stamps from London to New York that were being donated from the United Nations to the UNIS. The stamps were being held at Stanley Gibbons and were to be auctioned off the following month at the Headquarters of the United Nations to raise money for the UNIS scholarship fund. The stamps could not be carried aboard the Harriers because the jets were not equipped to carry cargo and the landing site was not designated as a port of entry for goods. In exchange for using the future site of the UNIS as a take-off and landing point in the competition, the Royal Air Force also donated $1,000 of its prize money to the school.

=== Others ===
A Royal Canadian Navy CHSS-2 helicopter competed in the race, landing two times on destroyers positioned in the Atlantic for refuelling. The United States Air Force was going to enter the race with a B-58 Hustler, but withdrew to avoid political issues due to the country's involvement in the Vietnam War.

== Prize winners ==
Trophies and prizes for the air race's 21 categories were awarded at a dinner held at the Royal Garden Hotel in Kensington on 14 May 1969. The winners were presented to Prince Philip at the reception before the dinner.

=== London to New York ===
Event	Name	Aircraft	Time	Prize
Shortest time	Sqn Ldr Tom Lecky-Thompson	Hawker Siddeley Harrier	6 hrs 11 min	£6,000
Sub-sonic aircraft	R. W. Selph	Boeing 707	7 hrs 6 min	£4,000
Scheduled passenger flight via Shannon	Clement. R. Freud (Note: Using an Aer Lingus scheduled flight)	Boeing 707	8 hrs 4 min	£5,000
Unsponsored personal attempt via Shannon	E. A. Freudmann		8 hrs 14 min	£2,500
Chartered business jet	Sir Billy Butlin	Hawker Siddeley HS.125	11 hrs 30 min (Note: less a 6hr handicap)	£500
Light Aircraft (man)	S. Wilkinson	Beagle B.206	20 hrs 23 min	£1,000
Light aircraft (woman)	Sheila Scott	Piper Comanche	26 hrs 34 min	£1,000

=== New York to London ===
Event	Name	Aircraft	Time	Prize
Shortest time	Lt Cdr Peter Goddard	McDonnell Douglas Phantom	5 hrs 12 min	£6,000
Sub-sonic	Peter Hammond		6 hrs 54 min	£4,000
Direct passenger flight	K J Holden	Boeing 707	6 hrs 48 min	£5,000
Unsponsored personal attempt	Miss S M Scribner	Boeing 707	6 hrs 55 min	£2,500
Chartered business jet	Tony Drewery	Vickers VC10	7 hrs 3 min	£500
Light aircraft (man)	Michael Fallon	Piper Twin Comanche	21 hrs 31 min	£1,000
Light aircraft (woman)	Nancy Kelly	Riley Rocket	22 hrs 31 min	£1,000

=== Non-Winning Meritorious Awards ===
Event	Name	Time	Prize
Commonwealth Entry (London to New York)	Valerie Rosario	7 hrs 15 min	£2,000
Commonwealth Entry (New York to London)	Neil Campbell Stevens	108 hrs 14 min	£2,000
Best performance in a light aircraft under 5,000 lb (2,268 kg)	Mira John Slovak	175 hrs 42 min	£1,000
British Entry	David A. Wynne-Davies; Julia Turner; Patricia Johnson	44 hrs 3 min 33 hrs 34 min 27 hrs 29 min	£5,250 (shared)
American Entrant	William Guinther	22 hrs 13 min	£5,000
New York State Resident	Nicholas A. Kleiner	10 hrs 55 min	£1,000
Fastest Swiss National Overall	Bert Studer	7 hrs 45 min	£1,000
