= Clive Feigenbaum =

British businessman

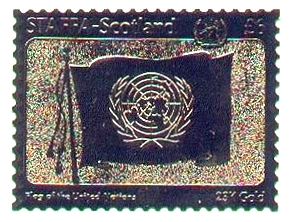
A "gold" stamp of Staffa.

Clive Harold Feigenbaum (1939–2007) was a colourful and controversial British businessman who was involved in a lifelong series of scandals in the world of philately. Particularly notable was the sale of "gold" stamps from Staffa and his role in the collapse of attempts to list Stanley Gibbons on the Unlisted Securities Market in 1984.

== Early life ==
Feigenbaum was born in 1939. According to the biographical profile on the website of his firm Stampdile Limited, Feigenbaum started dealing in stamps as a child and had his own shop in Paddington by the age of 18.

== Expelled from The Philatelic Traders Society ==
In 1970, Feigenbaum was expelled from the trade body for stamp dealers, The Philatelic Traders Society, for selling "labels resembling stamps" without indicating that they were not genuine postage stamps, though Feigenbaum claimed that he resigned from the body. The dispute turned on the status of the stamps that Feigenbaum produced and marketed which he termed British locals, similar to those produced for the island of Lundy, but which the PTS saw as little more than tourist souvenir labels. In 1984 Feigenbaum applied for re-admission but withdrew his application before it could be considered following adverse press comment about his business affairs. The Times reported that "Six leading stamp dealers have said they will resign if he is readmitted."

== Criminal charges ==
In 1971, Feigenbaum was charged with 14 counts of receiving and dishonestly handling stamps and proofs stolen from the British Museum. James A. Mackay, a curator at the museum, and George Base were also charged in connection with the same matter and it was from Mackay that Feigenbaum had received the stolen items. Mackay had exchanged the proofs for Winston Churchill themed stamps. Feigenbaum, who had denied the charges, was cleared on the judge's direction. The affair sparked a review of security at the museum and the police officer who investigated the thefts, Bob Schoolley-West, subsequently joined the Museum staff.

== Nagaland, Eynhallow and Dhufar ==
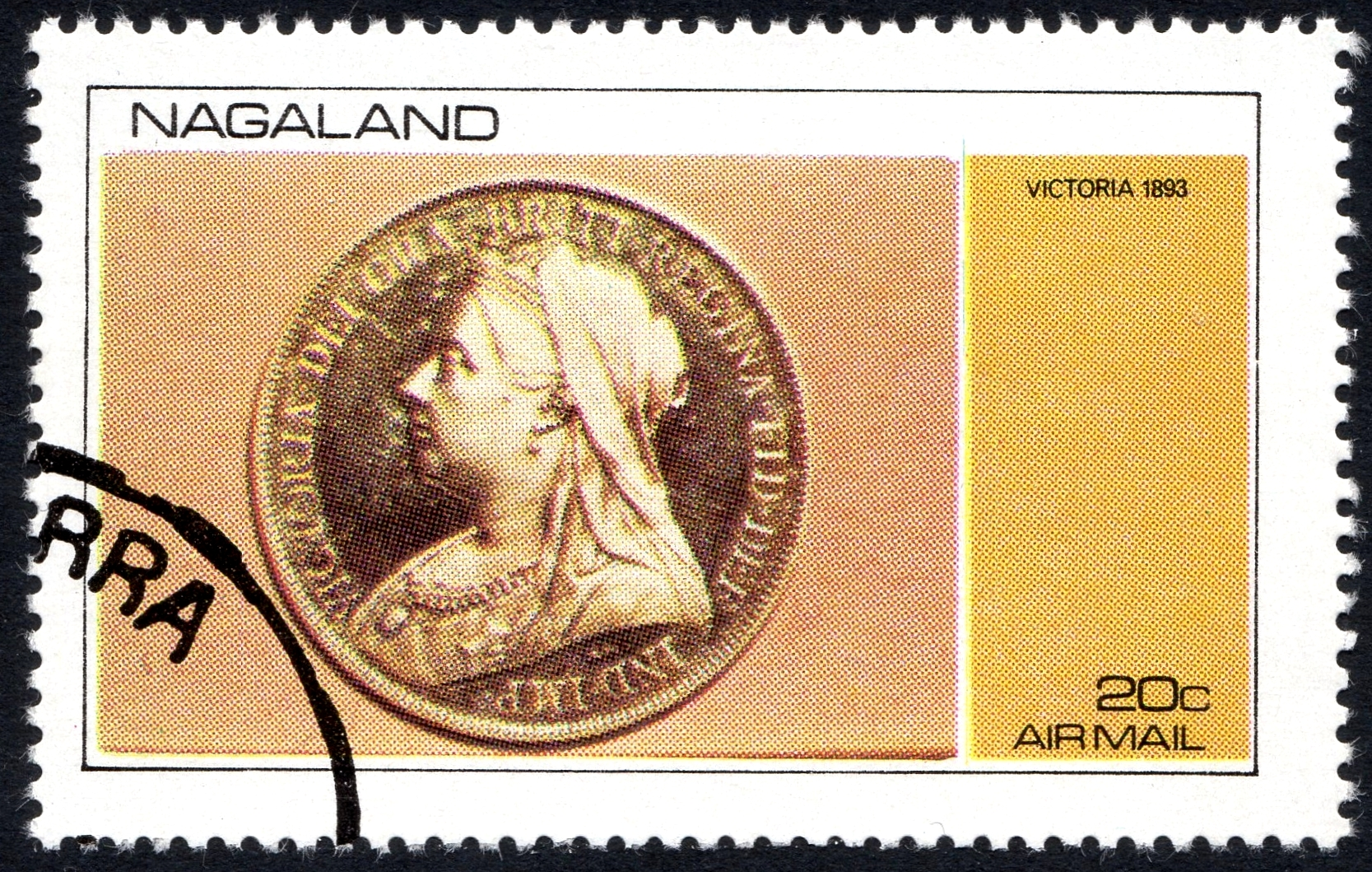
A stamp, supposedly from Nagaland, with a pre-printed postmark, believed to have been created by Clive Feigenbaum or companies associated with him.

Feigenbaum is believed to have been behind the issue of stamps supposedly from the Indian state of Nagaland in the 1970s and 80s. Gold stamps, similar to those of Staffa, were also produced for Nagaland. In 1985, Phillips auctioneers disposed of bulk lots of Nagaland, Eynhallow and Dhufar in their 26 September sale, causing Gibbons Stamp Monthly to comment: "...not the sort of material one normally associates with Phillips sales. Most were offered in considerable quantities (several thousand), estimates were very low". Stamps of Staffa, Nagaland, Eynhallow and Dhufar are still commonly found together in collections today, indicating their probable common origin.

== Staffa Island ==
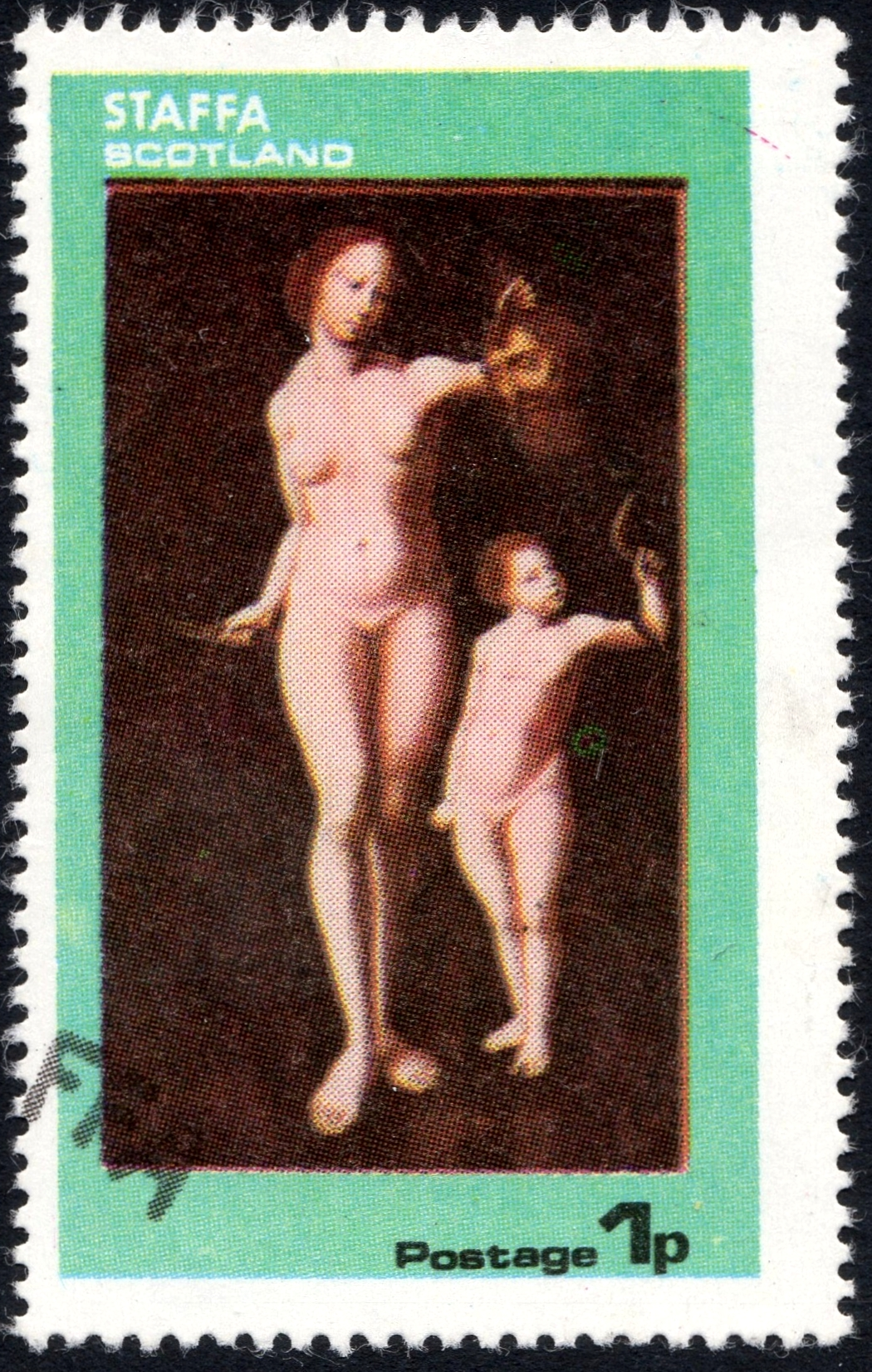
A stamp, purportedly from Staffa, with fake postmark, believed to have been produced by Feigenbaum or companies associated with him. The poor quality of the stamp is evident on close examination.

In 1979 Feigenbaum became involved in a dispute with the U.S. Customs Service about whether 20% duty applied to 'gold' stamps of Staffa imported into the United States. The stamps were to commemorate the United States Bicentenary and were in sets of up to 13 priced at $20 each, the total retail price of the stamps being $5.2 million. Feigenbaum argued that as Staffa had a legitimate mail service the stamps were not liable for the duty. However, the mail service at Staffa, a remote uninhabited Scottish island, actually amounted to no more than a mail box on a jetty where letters could be mailed back to the mainland, weather permitting. As no-one lived on Staffa and visitors were invariably from the mainland in the first place, it was doubtful whether the mail service amounted to anything more than a tourist curiosity. Feigenbaum had the right to produce stamps marked Staffa in return for a fee paid to the island's owner, who operated the postal service.

== Involvement with Stanley Gibbons ==
In 1984 Feigenbaum attempted to list Stanley Gibbons, of which he was chairman, on the Unlisted Securities Market in London but the attempt failed after newspaper disclosures about his previous business problems. The Times described the attempted float as "disastrous" and reported Feigenbaum's resignation as Chairman of Stanley Gibbons shortly thereafter. The London Stock Exchange had refused to allow dealings to begin and managing director David Stokes was quoted as saying in The Times that "...the press comment obviously ruined the reputation of Mr Feigenbaum in the eyes of the Stock Exchange." Feigenbaum sold his approximately 13.4% stake in the company to companies controlled by Paul Fraser in 1989.

== Bernera Islands ==
In 1985, Feigenbaum returned to 'gold' stamps with a series on the life and times of H.M. The Queen Mother supposedly from the Scottish Bernera Islands (Great and Little Bernera). The stamps had a face value of £10 each and were marketed as "22-carat gold-embossed stamps". The stamps were ostensibly to pay the cost of transporting a letter by boat to the British mainland where it entered the normal postal system once a Royal Mail stamp was applied. For comparison, the cost of a first class letter in 1985 was 17p and a second class letter 12p.

== Tanzania ==
In 1985, Feigenbaum was the organiser of stamps of Tanzania to mark the 85th birthday of H.M. The Queen Mother. The stamps had to be reprinted when it emerged that the original designs were marked "85th Year of H.R.H. The Queen Mother" rather than "85th Birthday of H.M. Queen Elizabeth The Queen Mother". The stamps, printed by Holders Press, were eventually issued in corrected form on 30 September 1985 while the original printing was not issued in Tanzania. The British Crown Agents recommended that the original stamps be destroyed, however, they continue to be available on eBay and through stamp dealers. Holders Press went on to produce a number of further stamp issues for Tanzania.

== Tax shelter schemes ==
In the mid-1980s Feigenbaum, and companies he and his associates controlled, were named in litigation relating to tax shelter schemes in the United States. The companies controlled included companies registered in Liberia for tax reasons. According to The Sunday Times, Feigenbaum and others had created a complicated scheme involving what they called "stamp masters" (printing plates) used for producing stamps of Scottish islands, which were transferred between a succession of companies in order to obtain a tax advantage. The judge in the case, Whitman Knapp, described the arrangements as "abusive tax shelters" and a "conspiracy to perpetrate a tax fraud".

The ruling of Judge Knapp was upheld on appeal and the appeal judges commented that the "...meaning of his decision comes through loud and clear--the tax shelter sold by the appellants was a sham and the appellants knew it." The appellants were enjoined from continuing to offer the philatelic tax shelter for sale.

== Tuvalu ==
In the late 1980s, Feigenbaum, as Chairman of the Philatelic Distribution Corporation was involved in a complicated legal case alleging fraud in relation to a contract with the government of Tuvalu, formerly the Ellice Islands, relating to the deliberate production of stamps with errors for sale to collectors at inflated prices. According to the New York Times, "P.D.C. produced 14,000 deliberate errors: stamps with inverted centers, missing elements or perforation varieties, which it sold for inflated prices".

In May 1989, the British High Court ordered Feigenbuam to hand over all stocks of Tuvalu stamps after the island authorities claimed that he was printing stamps without permission. British police had already seized 7 million stamps of which 1.5 million were thought to contain errors. Feigenbaum was accused of not complying with the court order in June 1989 and the Tuvalu Attorney General, David Ballantyne, asked that Feigenbaum be imprisoned for contempt of court. He was fined £3,000 and sentenced to jail but immediately released on bail pending an appeal. The appeal was heard in October 1989 when the fine for £3,000 was upheld but the jail sentence and costs of around £100,000 were set aside. The case made The Times law reports.

The matter eventually came to a head in a 1992 fraud trial when, after two months of evidence and weeks of legal argument, Feigenbaum was cleared on the judge's direction as there was insufficient evidence to convict. Feigenbaum argued that he had contractual permission to produce the varieties.

== Format International ==
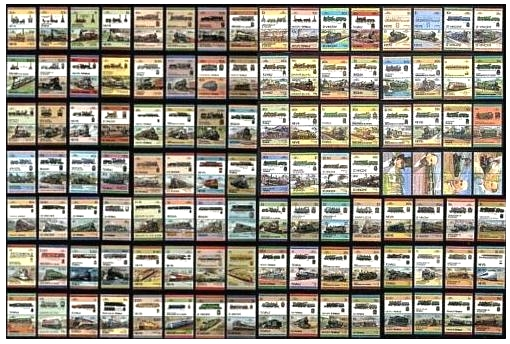
A selection of stamps from the locomotives section of the Leaders of the World series. This part alone included over 800 different stamps.

Format International Security Printers Ltd. (FI), was incorporated on August 4, 1967. They produced many of the stamp issues handled by the Philatelic Distribution Corporation and its predecessors Philatelists Limited and Philatelists 1980 Limited. Format also handled many stamp issues for the British Crown Agents as well who was one of their main customer. The British Crown Agents actually had an office and storage room that held special Crown Agent watermarked paper used for the production of their stamp issues. Clive Feigenbaum was chairman from 1988 until the firm began liquidation proceeding on July 31, 1989. The liquidation took almost eleven years when the company was dissolved on February 22, 2001. FI printed stamps for over a hundred countries including numerous Commonwealth countries amongst which were the controversial "Leaders of the World" series and did indeed produce stamps containing deliberate errors - the subject of the Tuvalu court case referred to above. All business references taken from Companies House (located in the United Kingdom) microfilmed documents which are all public records.

== Star Wars and Teletubbies stamps ==
In 2001, Stampdile Limited was fined £5,000 at Harrow Magistrates Court for supplying "Star Wars" and "Teletubbies" stamps which breached trademark laws. Clive Feigenbaum was fined £1,500 personally over the same matter.

== Easdale ==
Feigenbaum was the major landowner on the island of Easdale in the west of Scotland, for which one of his firms produced "stamps" of doubtful validity. The island website, now defunct, commented in 2002 that the stamps were "...certainly not used for postage on this island, or in the UK." Feigenbaum bought his interest in the island for £300,000 in the early 1990s with an eye to producing stamps with the Easdale name. His efforts were not always appreciated, however, and Frances Shand Kydd, mother of Diana, Princess of Wales, threatened to sue Feigenbaum in 1998 after he produced a stamp of Diana meeting Mother Teresa. One local was quoted in The Sunday Times as saying "It is bloody embarrassing at times, he sells these stamps to the Japanese. We even had the Japanese ambassador phoning to complain that Japan's emperor was featured on one. [Bill] Clinton and [Monica] Lewinsky were on another."

Following Feigenbaum's death in 2007, the ownership of the common land on the island passed to his son, Jonathan.

== Other interests ==
Feigenbaum was a keen rugby and cricket player. He was a past chairman of the Belmont & Edgware Cricket Club, a cricket club in Hertfordshire.
