= The Philatelic Exporter =

- The Philatelic Exporter, April 2012
- Editor: Alison Boyd
- Categories: Philately
- Frequency: Monthly
- First issue: 1945
- Final issue: 2023
- Company: Stanley Gibbons
- Country: United Kingdom
- Language: British English

The Philatelic Exporter, established May 1945, was a trade magazine produced for the international stamp trade. It was published monthly by Stanley Gibbons who acquired the title in January 2009 from Heritage Studios Limited. It ceased publication in February 2023. The final editor was Alison Boyd. Previous editors included Arthur Stansfield followed by Graham Phillips.
