= Philatelic auction =

A philatelic auction, or stamp auction, is a sale of stamps, covers and other philatelic material usually run by stamp dealers or specialist collectibles auctioneers, such as David Feldman, Christie's and Sotheby's, where prospective purchasers place bids in an attempt to obtain the desired items.

The highest bidder for each lot (described item or items) makes the purchase. Auctions are generally divided into mail sales, where bids are accepted by mail, and public sales, where mail bids are combined with live bidding from individuals present at the auction or participating by telephone.

Auctions usually allow prospective purchasers to view the items beforehand, either in a catalogue, in the auction house, or both.

== See also ==
- Mystic Stamp Company
- Philatelic investment
- Robson Lowe
- Stanley Gibbons
