= Panshanger Aerodrome =

Airport in Hertfordshire, England, 1940s–2014

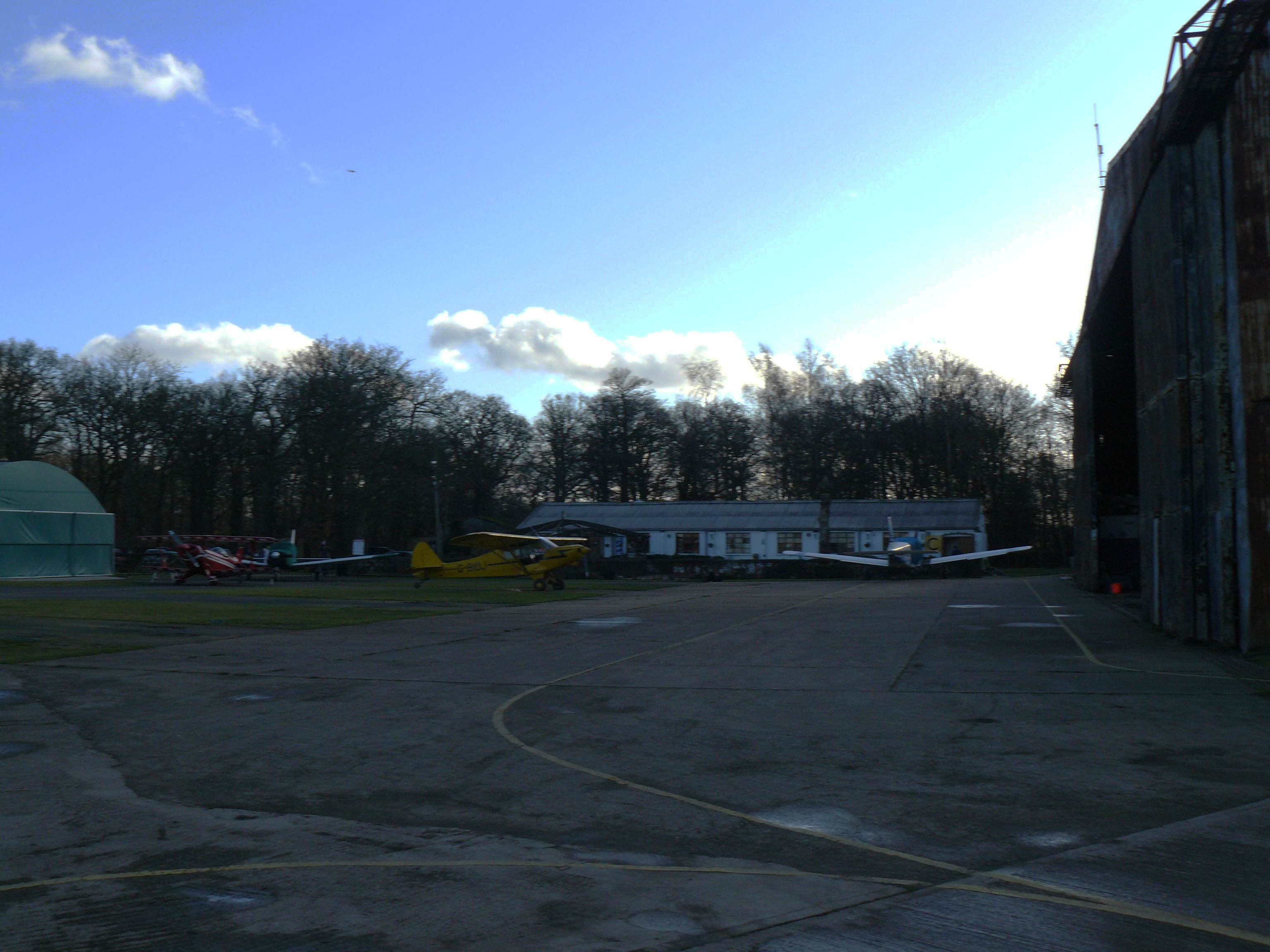
- IATA: none; ICAO: EGLG

Summary
- Airport type: Private-owned, Public-use
- Operator: Closed
- Location: Welwyn Garden City, Hertfordshire, England
- Closed: 20 September 2014
- Elevation AMSL: 250 ft (76 m)
- Coordinates: 51°48′07″N 000°09′30″W

Map
- Location in Hertfordshire

Runways
Direction	Length		Surface
Direction	m	ft	Surface
11/29	975	3,199	Grass
- Sources: UK AIP at NATS

Panshanger Aerodrome (ICAO: EGLG) was a general aviation aerodrome located on the most eastern tip of Welwyn Garden City, Hertfordshire, England, approximately 3 miles (4.8 km) west of Hertford.

== Wartime history ==
During the Second World War, a decoy aerodrome for the de Havilland factory at Hatfield was built on land at Holwell Hyde, just south of Panshanger airfield, and the Royal Air Force occasionally made use of it for training. Panshanger airfield itself was more regularly used by the Royal Air Force for training purposes and a large Bellman hangar was erected to accommodate the aircraft based there. This structure still exists, albeit in a dilapidated condition.

No. 1 Elementary Flying School, equipped with Tiger Moth biplane trainers was active at the aerodrome from September 1942. No. 127 Gliding School was operational at Panshanger from August 1943 until closure in May 1948.

After the war, No. 1 Reserve Flying School was based at Panshanger from May 1947 until its closure in May 1953. It was managed by De Havilland Aircraft.

== Postwar operations ==
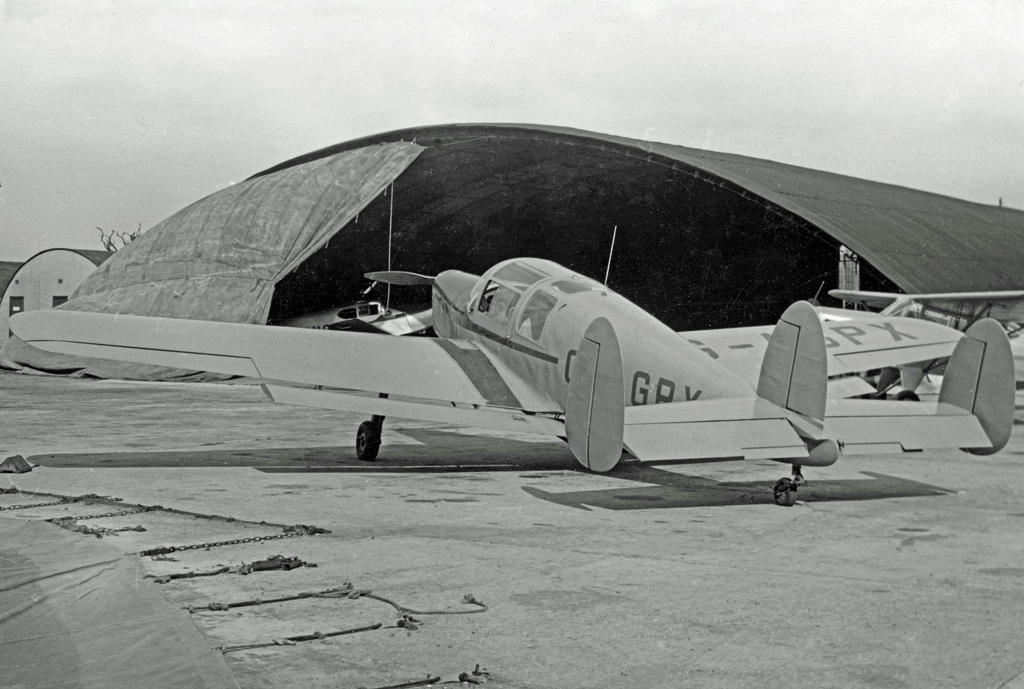
Miles Messenger at Panshanger in 1953 with a wartime open-ended hangar in the background

From 1946, the airfield was used by flying clubs for training and recreational flying, and also by private owner pilots. A small arched hangar with canvas end closures was in use by 1953.

During its time of operation, Panshanger Aerodrome had a United Kingdom Civil Aviation Authority Ordinary Licence (Number P782) that allowed flights for the public transport of passengers or for flying instruction as authorised by the licensee. The aerodrome was not licensed for night use.

The aerodrome was once home to the North London Flying School (a trading name of East Herts Flying School), which offered Fixed-Wing PPL, instructor and aerobatics training. The school used Piper Cherokee aircraft for most of its training, although it also owned a Piper J-3 (Cub), an Extra 300L and a Piper PA-32R (Saratoga) for other training and hire purposes.

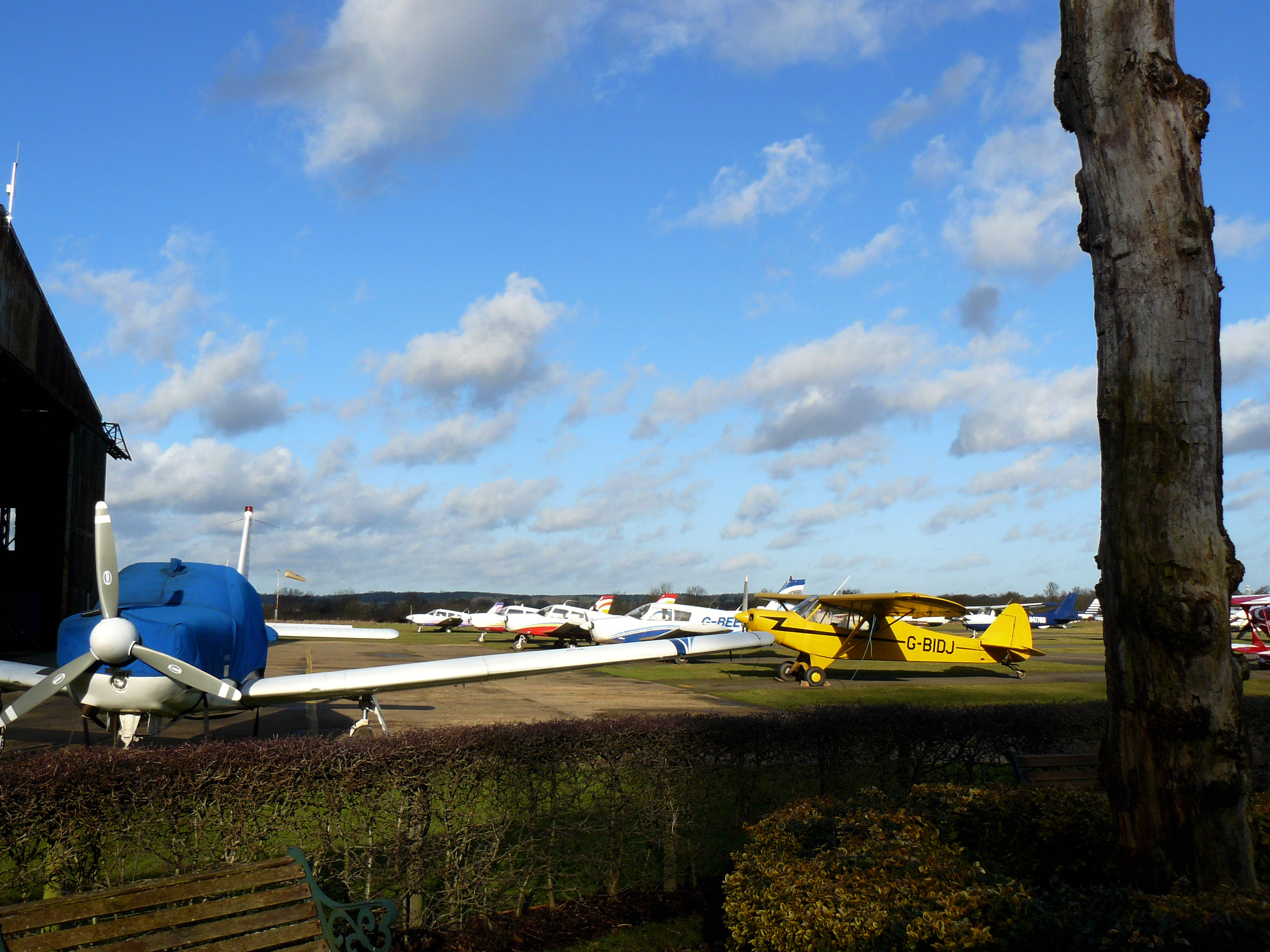
Panshanger Aerodrome

De Havilland apprentices were offered subsidised flying training at Panshanger from 1949 to 1952 on Tiger Moths and Chipmunks.

== Aerodrome under threat ==
The aerodrome had been under threat from a planning proposal to build 700 houses on the site following the expiry of the lease. Many hundreds of local residents, pilots, aviation organisations and members of the North London Flying Club were against the proposal which ended its public consultation on 31 January 2014. A HM Government e-Petition against the plans was set up but failed to attract enough signatures to move to debate.

== Aerodrome closure ==
The aerodrome closed on 20 September 2014 following the expiry of the lease from the land owner, who intended to re-designate the use of the land for other purposes. The flying school and restaurant also closed. There have been efforts to have it re-opened, with campaigners aiming to convince the council that the aerodrome was a great economic and social asset.

A potential reprieve was reported on 28 July 2016. After strong representations, the local Council hope to pursue a mixed use option, with general aviation activities alongside a smaller number of new houses on part of the airfield site.

In July 2023, Welwyn Hatfield Borough Council extended an existing proposal for 650 homes on the old airfield site, by adding permission for another 210 dwellings. The new development will be known as DeHavilland Park, and will replace the aerodrome with housing, a new local centre, a primary school, and recreational space.
