= Stanley Gibbons =

British stamp dealer and philatelic publisher

Stanley Gibbons Group plc
- Type: Public (AIM)
- Traded as: AIM: SGI
- ISIN: GB0009628438
- Industry: Specialist retailing
- Founded: 1856
- Headquarters: Ringwood & London.
- Key people: Harry Wilson - Chairman
- Website: www.stanleygibbons.com

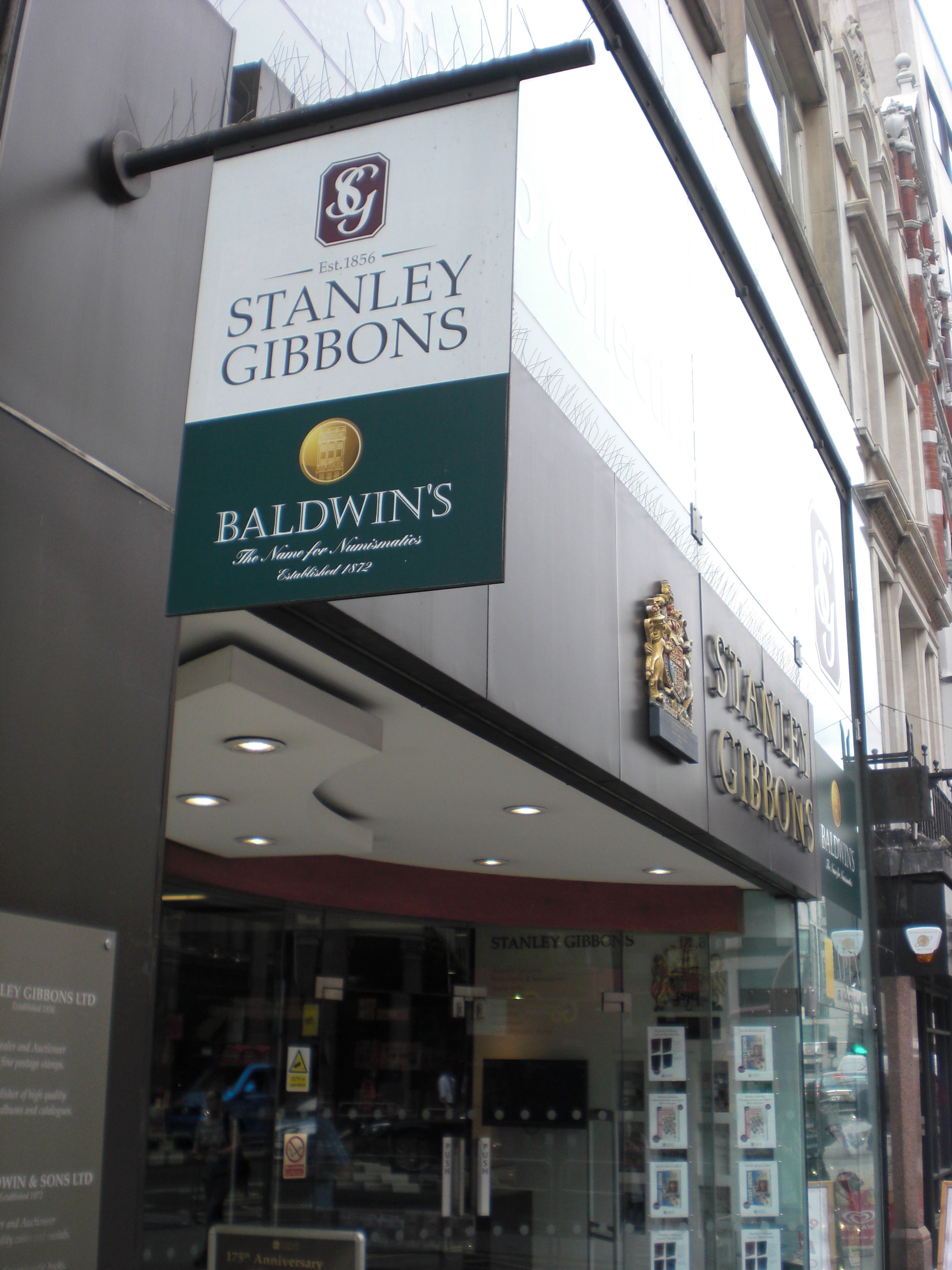
Stanley Gibbons 399 Strand

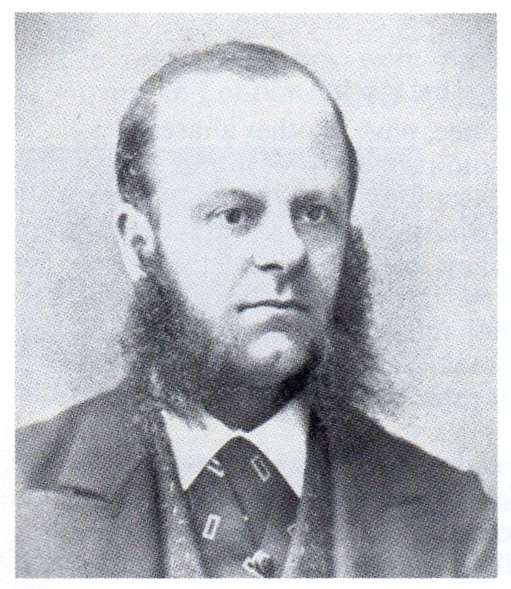
Edward Stanley Gibbons (1840–1913), the founder of the firm.

The Stanley Gibbons Group plc is a company quoted on the London Stock Exchange specialising in the retailing of collectable postage stamps and similar products. The group is incorporated in London. The company is a major stamp dealer and philatelic publisher. The company's philatelic subsidiary, Stanley Gibbons Limited, had a royal warrant of appointment from Queen Elizabeth II.

== History ==
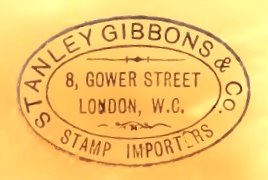
Stanley Gibbons rubber stamp impression Gower Street 1881.

The company has a long corporate history, having started as a sole trader business owned by Edward Stanley Gibbons in 1856 and now being a quoted company with a number of subsidiaries.

=== Before 1900 ===
The business started when, employed as an assistant in his father's pharmacy shop in Plymouth, Gibbons set up a counter selling stamps. In 1863 he was fortunate enough to purchase from two sailors a sackful of rare Cape of Good Hope triangular stamps.

In 1874 Gibbons moved to a house near Clapham Common in south London and in 1876 he moved again to Gower Street in Bloomsbury near the British Museum.

By 1890 Stanley Gibbons wished to retire and the business was sold to Charles Phillips for £25,000 (equivalent to £3.5 million in 2024). Phillips became managing director, with Gibbons as chairman.

In 1891 a shop was opened at 435 Strand in addition to the Gower Street premises, and in 1893 the shop and offices were amalgamated at 391 Strand where the company's retail premises remained for many years until they moved to 399 Strand.

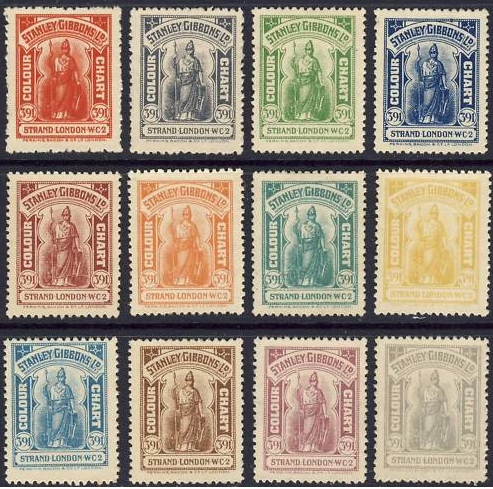
Stanley Gibbons colour guide stamps printed by Perkins Bacon

=== 1900–1959 ===
A new issue department was opened in 1906. In 1914 the company received a royal warrant from George V, followed in 1940 by another from George VI. In 1956 the company celebrated its centenary with an exhibition at the Waldorf Hotel opened by Sir John Wilson. In the same year, Queen Elizabeth II granted her royal warrant to Stanley Gibbons Ltd as her philatelist.

=== 1960s ===
In 1967 the firm expanded into the United States in a joint venture with Whitman Publishing. A magazine and catalogues were produced.

In 1968 the previously privately company was floated on the stock market through a tender arranged by S.G. Warburg. The offer was a huge success and was oversubscribed five times. The shares were sold at 20 shillings rather than the minimum tender price of 12 shillings and six pence. It was estimated that there were 30 to 35 shareholders before the offer and they still owned 66% of the equity after the offer, worth at least £1.8 million before trading began. Prices subsequently slipped back, however, later in the year.

=== 1970s ===
In 1970 The Crown Agents acquired a 20% stake in the company and appointed two Directors to the Gibbons board. The stake was sold in 1976 by which time it had grown to 25% of the company.

In 1977 Stanley Gibbons acquired the stock of the firm Chas Nissen, once run by the eminent stamp dealer and philatelist Charles Nissen.

In 1979 Gibbons was bought by Letraset for £19 million in an attempt to diversify away from their dry-lettering business, but the acquisition did not go smoothly and, like Flying Flowers later, Letraset found it difficult to integrate Gibbons into its core business. The chairman of Letraset blamed "indiscriminate expansion" and "imprudent" investment decisions for the problems at Gibbons and was quoted in The Times as saying "We significantly overpaid for what we got." The US$10 million paid by Gibbons for the Marc Haas collection was also questioned.

=== 1980s ===
In 1981 Letraset was acquired by Esselte after a takeover battle with Mills & Allen International. Letraset had been fatally weakened by its lossmaking Stanley Gibbons subsidiary. Later that year Gibbons was put up for sale by Esselte as they said it did not form a logical part of their long-term development.

In 1981 Gibbons bought the stock of the late H.F. Johnson.

In 1982 Clive Feigenbaum staged a management buy-out followed by an application in 1984 for a listing on the UK's Unlisted Securities Market in order to raise funds for new acquisitions. Following the buy-out, Feigenbaum, the chairman, had owned over 50% of the shares with the others owned by the rest of the board. The listing went ahead but the shares were suspended within moments of their debut even before trading had begun, following concerns about Feigenbaum's background highlighted in an article in the Sunday Times. The suspension was said to be the fastest on record at that time. The concerns had surrounded Feigenbaum's expulsion from the Philatelic Traders Society for breaching their code of ethics and his sale of "23 carat gold" stamps of no postal validity from the island of Staffa. U.S. government tests had shown the stamps, sold at £10 each, to have a gold value of about 5c each. The debacle was said to have caused considerable embarrassment, not just to the company but also to its USM brokers Simon & Coates. Shortly afterwards, Feigenbaum resigned as chairman and was bought out by a consortium of institutions and individuals for £3 million. A further attempt at a listing was planned for 1985 but did not go ahead.

In 1989 Paul Fraser began to invest in the firm, and he purchased a further 30% stake in the company from New Zealand businessman Sir Ron Brierley who is a stamp collector.

=== 1990s ===
Paul Fraser was appointed Executive Chairman in 1990. By 1995 Fraser had acquired 76.83% of Gibbons shares and he purchased the rest of the shares in December 1995.

In June 1998 the company was sold for £13.5 million to Flying Flowers. Paul Fraser took shares in Flying Flowers instead of cash and was left with an 8% stake in the enlarged company following the deal. The merger was not a success and in 2000 the two companies were demerged again after a series of profits warnings and trading problems. Paul Fraser's stake was reduced in value from £13.5 million to £4 million. The de-merged Stanley Gibbons became communitie.com and was listed on AIM. The chairman of Flying Flowers was quoted as saying the deal "...was at the wrong price and at the wrong time."

=== Since 2000 ===
In August 2007, Paul Fraser resigned as Executive Chairman and in April 2008 he sold his remaining shares to focus on Paul Fraser Collectibles. Bob Henkhuzens became interim chairman and the current chairman is David Bralsford, who works in a non-executive capacity.

On 20 September 2010 the company announced it had acquired the trade and assets of the Benham first day cover and collectibles business from Flying Brands Limited. On 21 November 2013, Stanley Gibbons successfully completed its acquisition of Noble Investments, bringing Apex, Baldwin's (numismatic auctioneers), and Dreweatts & Bloomsbury Auctions into the group. In 2014, two further acquisitions followed: On 31 January the company acquired Murray Payne, the world's leading dealer in British Commonwealth King George VI stamps and on 23 October The Fine Art Auction Group, holding company of the Group's subsidiary, Dreweatts and Bloomsbury, announced that it had acquired Mallett Antiques - a dealer in antiques and decorative arts with retail premises on London's Dover St and New York's Madison Avenue.

On 28 January 2015 the company was awarded 'Deal of the Year' at the 2015 Quoted Company Awards for its acquisition of Noble Investments.

In July 2015 the company announced that The Fine Art Auction Group had acquired Bid for Wine, a specialist online wine auctioneer founded in 2008 by barrister Spenser Hilliard and ex-management consultant Lionel Nierop.

Later in 2015 the group's share value started to fall significantly, dropping from 240p in August 2015 to 15.75p in April 2016. This general decline continued, with lows of 1.5p being recorded in March 2020.

Stanley Gibbons (Guernsey) Limited, the group's subsidiary which handled investment portfolios, was placed under administration on 21 November 2017, with Nick Vermeulen and Zelf Hussain as joint administrators.

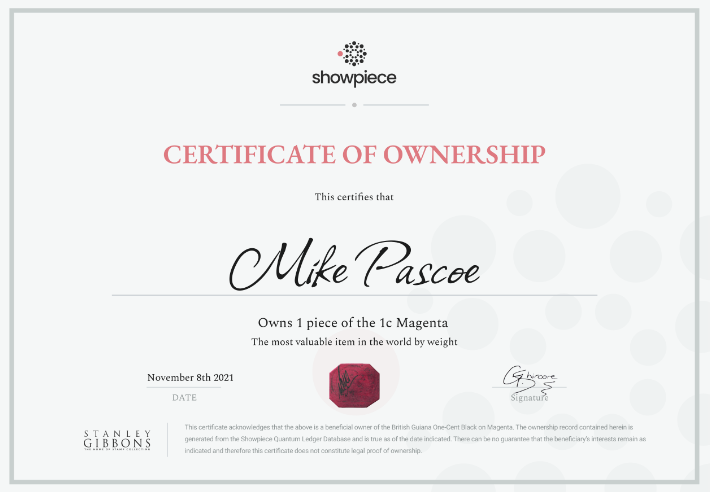
Digital copy of the certificate of fractional ownership of the 1c Magenta postage stamp.

On 8 June 2021, Stanley Gibbons purchased the British Guiana 1c magenta at auction for $8,307,000. The company has since offered shares in the stamp to collectors using the showpiece platform.

On 22 December 2023, Stanley Gibbons announced the company's insolvency. In a "pre-pack administration process" the business was bought back by a new company called Strand Collectibles Group.

In 2025, Stanley Gibbons launched its Comics Division with key issues Marvel and DC as a way to diversify its business.

== Stamp catalogues ==
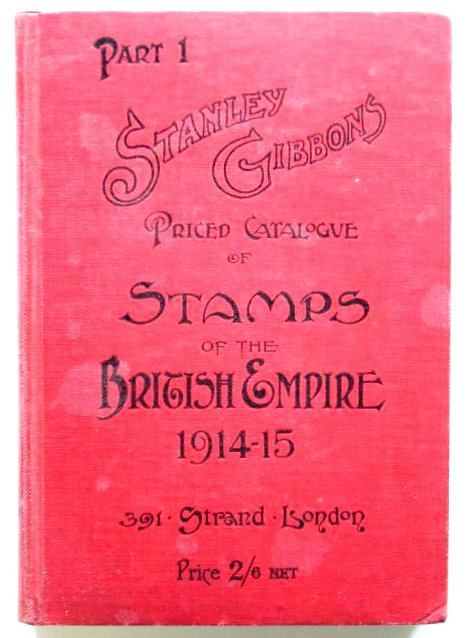
The cover of a 1914-15 edition of the "Part One" British Empire catalogue.

The first Stanley Gibbons stamp catalogue was a penny price list issued in November 1865 and reissued at monthly intervals for the next 14 years. The company produces numerous catalogues covering different countries, regions and specialisms; many of them are reissued annually. The catalogues list all known adhesive postage stamp issues and include prices for used and unused stamps.

Unlike other dealers' catalogues, Stanley Gibbons state that their catalogue is a retail price list. In other words, if they had that exact stamp in stock in the exact condition specified, the current catalogue price is the price that they would charge for it. This contrasts with most other catalogues which are produced by firms that do not sell stamps and therefore base their pricing on an average of market values in the country where the catalogue is published.

In practice, the actual price charged by Stanley Gibbons for an individual stamp may be different from the catalogue price because the specimen for sale is of a different grade, the market conditions have changed since the catalogue was produced, the firm has a plentiful or restricted supply of that stamp, or for a variety of other reasons.

== Magazines ==
Gibbons Stamp Monthly

Gibbons Stamp Monthly is a magazine that lists new issues and publishes articles of interest to philatelists. Gibbons have published a number of journals over the years but only settled on Gibbons Stamp Monthly as their core magazine in 1927. On 23 January 2009, Gibbons acquired the philatelic trade magazine The Philatelic Exporter from Heritage Studios Limited.

== Retail stamp business ==
As well as publishing, Stanley Gibbons is a stamp dealer with a retail business located on the Strand in their Central London offices offering both older stamps and new issues and fulfilling customer want lists. They produce their own line of other philatelic products, such as albums, stock books, and other accessories.

== Auction house ==
The company is also a philatelic auction house and has held thousands of international sales since it was established in 1901.

== See also ==
- List of stamp catalogues
