= Paul Fraser =

British businessman (born 1955)

- Born: May 1955 (age 71)
- Occupation: businessman

Paul Ian Fraser (born May 1955) is a British businessman. He came to prominence through his involvement in the purchase and sale of the famous stamps firm Stanley Gibbons which he sold at a great profit, only to see most of the proceeds lost following trading difficulties. Before this Fraser had a background in accountancy, mail-order, retailing and property development.

== Plastic Wax ==
In 1976 Fraser became a partner in Plastic Wax, a company in Bristol which specialised in collectible records and still exists. In 1978 the firm started to offer music memorabilia and this became the collectibles firm Fraser's Autographs. Ultimately, Fraser's Autographs became part of Stanley Gibbons in 1996.

== Stanley Gibbons ==
Fraser first invested in Stanley Gibbons in 1989 when he acquired a large block of shares in the company from Clive Feigenbaum. He purchased a further 30% stake in the company from New Zealand businessman Ron Brierley who is a stamp collector. In 1990 he was appointed Executive Chairman of the firm. By 1995 Fraser had acquired 76.83% of Gibbons shares and he purchased the rest of the shares in December 1995.

== Flying Flowers ==
In June 1998, Stanley Gibbons was sold for £13.5 million to Flying Flowers. In the deal Fraser took shares in Flying Flowers instead of cash and he was left with an 8% stake in the enlarged company following the transaction. The merger was not a success and in 2000 the two companies were demerged again after a series of profits warnings and trading problems. Fraser's stake was reduced in value from £13.5 million to £4 million. The demerged Stanley Gibbons became Communitie.com and was listed on AIM. The chairman of Flying Flowers was quoted as saying the deal "...was at the wrong price and at the wrong time."

In August 2007, Paul Fraser resigned as Executive Chairman of Stanley Gibbons and in April 2008 he sold his remaining shares to focus on Paul Fraser Collectibles.

== Paul Fraser Collectibles ==
Paul Fraser's current venture is Tika Lifestyles Limited, trading as Paul Fraser Collectibles, a company that specialises in the sale of high-end collectibles such as rare stamps, vintage wine and autographs.

The firm also provides a news service and a collectibles video channel known as PFC TV.

== Coull ==
On 14 March 2014 TechCrunch revealed Fraser to be the largest single investor in a $4m investment round in Coull, an online video ad tech company based in the United Kingdom.

== JewelStreet ==
On 27 June 2017 online handmade jewellery marketplace Jewelstreet issued a Companies House notification that Paul Ian Fraser was a person with significant control, as of 7 April 2016, holding directly or indirectly, 75% or more of the shares in the Company.
