= RAF St Pancras =

External image
- Harrier XV741 landing at St Pancras
- Harrier GR.1 landing at St Pancras from Royal Air Force Museum

RAF St Pancras

Site information
- Owner: Ministry of Defence
- Operator: Royal Air Force

Location
- Shown within London
- Coordinates: 51°31′59.7″N 000°07′46″W

Site history
- Built: 1969
- In use: May 1969 – May 1969

RAF St Pancras was a temporary, but official, Royal Air Force station established in the Somers Town Goods Yard beside St Pancras railway station in London. The base was opened and closed in May 1969. It served as the takeoff location of the winning entry of Flt Lt Tom Lecky-Thompson and Harrier XV741 in the London to New York leg of the Daily Mail Trans-Atlantic Air Race on 5 May. It also was the landing location for Harrier XV744 piloted by Sqn Ldr Graham Williams in the New York to London leg of the race on 9 May.

== See also ==
- List of former Royal Air Force stations
