= Index of philatelic articles =

This is a list of philatelic topics.

== A ==
- Acknowledgement of receipt
- Adhesive (stamp gum)
- Admirals
- Aerogram
- Aerophilately
- Affixing machine
- Airmail
- Airmail etiquette
- Airmail stamp
- Alexandria "Blue Boy" Postmaster's Provisional
- Arrow block
- Asian philately
- Astrophilately
- Auction (Philatelic)
- Awards

== B ==
- Balloon mail
- Bicycle mail
- Bisect
- Bogus postal markings
- Bogus stamp issue
- Booklet
- British Guiana 1c magenta
- Bulk mail

== C ==
- Cachet
- Camel mail
- Cancellation
- Cancelled to order
- Caribou mail
- Carrier's stamp
- Censored mail
- Center line block
- Certified mail
- Charity stamp
- Charles Henry Coster
- Chinese new year stamps
- Christmas seal
- Christmas stamp
- Cigarette tax stamp
- Cinderella stamp
- Circular delivery mail
- Civil War Patriotic Cacheted Covers
- Classic stamp
- Coil stamp
- Coil waste
- Color guide
- Color trial
- Combination cover
- Commemorative stamp
- Concentration camp mail
- Consular fee stamp
- Control mark
- Counterfeit stamps
- Courier mail
- Cover
- Crash cover
- Crown Agents Philatelic and Security Printing Archive
- Cut square

== D ==
- Damaged mail
- Dead letter mail
- Definitive issue
- Definitive series
- Delayed mail
- Design error
- Die proof
- Diplomatic pouch mail
- Dirigible mail
- Disinfected mail
- Dog mail
- Dogsled mail
- Dummy stamp

== E ==
- Earliest known use (EKU)
- Embossing
- Engraver's mark
- Engraving
- Entire
- Envelope
- Errors and varieties
- Errors, freaks, and oddities (EFO)
- Essay
- Expert
- Europa postage stamp
- Expertization
- Express company
- Express mail

== F ==
- Famous stamps
- Fancy cancel
- Favor cancel
- Favor sheet
- Fee paid mail
- Field post office
- First day ceremony
- First day cover
- First day of issue
- First flight cover
- First issue
- Fiscal cancel
- Fiscal issue
- Flat plate press
- Floor sweepings
- Forerunner
- Forged stamps
- Forwarding agent
- Fractional currency
- Franchise stamp
- Franking privilege
- Free frank
- Fumigated mail

== G ==
- Graphite lined stamp
- Grill
- Guide line
- Guide line pair
- Gum
- Gutter block
- Gutter pair

== H ==
- Handstruck stamp
- Health stamp
- Highway post office
- History of philately
- Hotel post
- Hovercraft mail

== I ==
- Illegal stamps
- Illustration law
- Imitation stamp
- Imperforate
- Imprint block
- Imprinted stamp
- Postage stamp ink
- Inscription
- Inscription block
- Institutional collection
- Insured mail
- International mail
- International reply coupon
- Inverted Jenny
- Inverted Swan
- Philatelic investment
- Irradiated mail
- Interrupted mail

- Italian Philatelic Press Association

== J ==
- James Chalmers
- Joint issue
- Joint line
- Joint line pair

== K ==
- Killer
- Kiloware

== L ==
- Label
- Late fee stamp
- Letter carrier
- Letterpress
- Letter sheet
- Line pair
- Linn's Stamp News
- List of entities that have issued postage stamps
- List of most expensive philatelic items
- List of notable postage stamps
- List of philatelic topics (deliberate self-link)
- List of philatelists
- List of stamp catalogues
- List of stamp collectors
- List of stamp dealers
- List of United States airmail stamps
- Lithography
- Local post
- Luminescent issue

== M ==
- Mail delivery by animal
- Mail fraud
- Mail robbery
- Mailman
- Marcophily
- Marginal marking
- Marine insurance stamp
- Maritime mail
- Maximaphily
- Maximum Card
- Metered mail
- Michel catalog
- Military mail
- Millennium stamp
- Miniature sheet
- Minipack
- Missing Virgin
- Mixed franking
- Mobile post office
- Money order
- Mr. Zip

== N ==
- Nassau Street (Manhattan)
- Naval cover
- Naval mail
- Navigation and Commerce issue
- New issue
- Newspaper stamp
- Newspaper wrapper
- Nicholas F. Seebeck

== O ==
- Occupation stamp
- Offices abroad
- Official mail
- Offset printing
- Overprint

== P ==
- Packet letter
- Packet mark
- Postage stamp paper
- Paquebot
- Parcel post
- Paste-up pair
- Penalty mail
- Pen cancel
- Penny post
- Perfin
- Perforation
- Perforation gauge
- Permit mail
- Phantom issue
- Philatelic agency
- Philatelic cover
- Philatelic literature
- Philatelic museums
- Philately
- Philatelic calendar
- PHQ Cards
- Picture post card
- Pigeon mail
- Pillar box
- Plate block
- Plate marking
- Plate number coil
- Printing plate
- Plating
- Plebiscite issue
- Pneumatic mail
- Polar mail and philately
- Postage due
- Postage stamp booklet
- Postage stamp color
- Postage stamp reuse
- Postage stamp separation
- Postal card
- Postal convention
- Postal history
- Postal laws and regulations
- Postal marking
- Postal route
- Postal savings
- Postal slogan
- Postal stationery
- Postal Stationery Society of Great Britain
- Postal tax
- Postal treaty
- Postal union
- Postcard
- Post office
- Post Office Cards
- Post Office circulars
- Post road
- Precancel
- Presentation album
- Presentation book
- Price list
- Postage stamp printing
- Postal relation
- Prisoner-of-war mail
- Private cancellation
- Private carrier
- Private overprint
- Private post
- Stamp proof
- Provisional stamp

== R ==
- Railway post office
- Railway mail
- Rare issue
- Ration stamp
- Receiving mark
- Red Cross label
- Registered mail
- Regummed stamp
- Reissue
- Reprint
- Remainder
- Reperforation
- Reply card
- Reply coupon
- Revenue cancellation
- Revenue stamp
- Rocket mail
- Rotary press
- Rouletting
- Rowland Hill

== S ==
- Savings issue
- Scott catalog
- Se-tenant
- Semi-official
- Semi-postal
- Separation
- Ship mail
- Siege mail
- Siderography
- Slogan cancellation
- Socked on the nose (SON)
- Souvenir card
- Souvenir sheet
- Space cover
- Space mail
- Special delivery
- Special handling
- Specimen stamp
- Stamp album
- Stamp catalog
- Stamp collecting
- Stamp condition
- Stamp design
- Stamp exhibition
- Stamp finder
- Stamp gum
- Stamp hinge
- Stamp mounting
- Stamp separation
- Stanley Gibbons
- Steamship issue
- Streetcar mail
- Strike mail
- Study circle
- Submarine mail
- Surcharge

== T ==
- Tax stamp
- Telegraph stamp
- Test stamp
- Tete-beche
- Thematic collecting
- Tin Can Mail
- Topical collecting
- Training stamp
- Transatlantic mail
- Transoceanic mail
- Treaty port
- Treskilling Yellow
- Trinacria stamp
- Triptych

== U ==
- Unaccepted design
- Undeliverable mail
- Undesirable issue
- Uniform Fourpenny Post
- Uniform Penny Post
- Universal Postal Union
- Untagged
- Used abroad

== V ==
- Valentine cover
- Variety
- Varnish bars
- Stamp vending machine
- View card

== W ==
- Want list
- War cover
- War issue
- War mail
- War savings issue
- War tax stamp
- Watermark
- World War II Patriotic Cacheted Covers
- Wrapper (philately)
- Wreck cover

== Y ==
- Yvert catalog

== Z ==
- Z Grill –
- Zeppelin mail –
- Zip block
