= Queen Victoria Lilac and Green Issue =

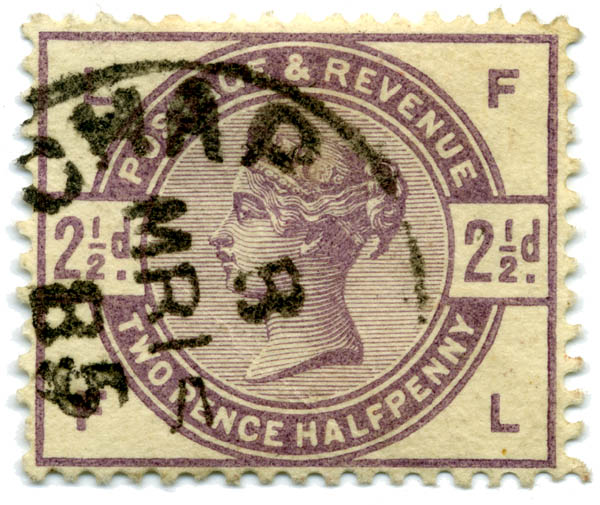
Queen Victoria Lilac and Green Issue

The Lilac and Green Issue is a series of postage and revenue stamps issued in the United Kingdom in 1883 and 1884. The stamps are known as such because they were only printed in those two colours; lilac being used for the 1 1/2d, 2d, 2 1/2d, 3d values and dull green for the 4d, 5d, 6d, 9d and 1s.

New stamps were required because the Customs and Inland Revenue Act 1881 necessitated postage stamps that were also valid as revenue stamps. Therefore, the Penny Lilac issued that year was inscribed "POSTAGE AND INLAND REVENUE" and the Lilac and Green stamps were inscribed "POSTAGE & REVENUE", whereas the previous 1880 stamps (known as the Provisional Issue) were only inscribed "POSTAGE". The colours were used because the authorities were concerned that the existing stamps were being soaked off envelopes and reused, and they wished to use fugitive inks that would wash away if immersed in water; the only fugitive ink colours available at the time were lilac and green.

The first stamp to be introduced was the 9d on 1 August 1883, which was rushed into use because there was an urgent need for a stamp of that value; the others followed on 1 April 1884. The designs featured Queen Victoria’s head in profile, with lettering in the corners. The 2d, 2 1/2d, 6d, and 9d stamps were in horizontal format and the 1 1/2d, 3d, 4d, 5d and 1s were vertical.

The dull stamps were not popular, and the 1884 Stamp Committee was formed to make decisions about improved replacements. In 1887 they were superseded by the Jubilee Issue, with a variety of designs and colours.

Due to the fugitive nature of the ink, many surviving examples of the green stamps have lost their original colour following soaking to remove them from paper; the examples that still have good colour are the most sought after by philatelists.
