= Penny Venetian Red =

British postage stamp

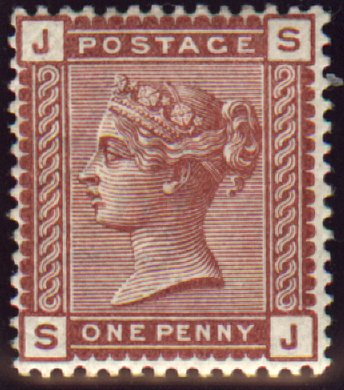
- Country of production: United Kingdom
- Date of production: 1880–July 1881
- Printer: De La Rue
- Face value: 1d

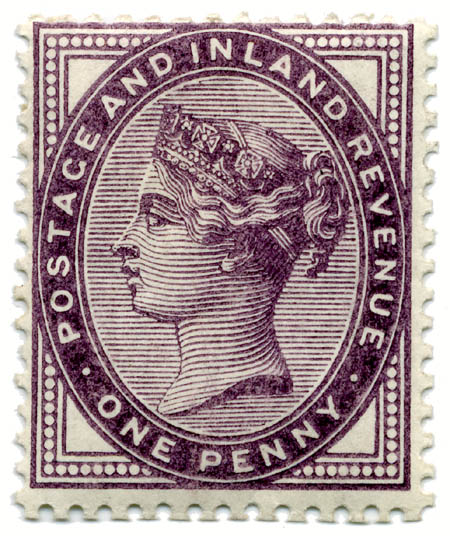
The Penny Lilac (seen here) replaced the Penny Venetian Red in 1881, after new legislation required different wording on stamps

The Penny Venetian Red was a British postage stamp equal to the value of one penny. Issued in 1880, it was designed and surface-printed by security printing company De La Rue. It superseded the Penny Red, which had been used in Great Britain since 1841, and was the third one-penny stamp to enter regular usage in the country.

The Venetian Red was aesthetically similar to the Penny Red, and to the Penny Black which had come before it, but was instead coloured a venetian red and had a square framing. Close to 1.5 billion Venetian Reds were printed during the stamp's run; the printing plates used allowed for 240 stamps each. Like its predecessors, the Venetian Red sported individual letters in each of its corners to identify its position on the plate.

Plate configuration
AA	AB	AC	AD	AE	AF	AG	AH	AI	AJ	AK	AL
BA	BB	BC	BD	BE	BF	BG	BH	BI	BJ	BK	BL
•	•	•	•	•	•	•	•	•	•	•	•
•	•	•	•	•	•	•	•	•	•	•	•
•	•	•	•	•	•	•	•	•	•	•	•
SA	SB	SC	SD	SE	SF	SG	SH	SI	SJ	SK	SL
TA	TB	TC	TD	TE	TF	TG	TH	TI	TJ	TK	TL

The Venetian Red had a short run, and was replaced by the Penny Lilac in July 1881. Its displacement is attributed to a change in government postal policy: the Customs and Inland Revenue Act 1881 necessitated the creation of a new provision of revenue stamps. A new inscription was therefore needed, and the new Penny Lilacs featured the words "POSTAGE AND INLAND REVENUE" and "ONE PENNY", instead of "POSTAGE" and "ONE PENNY" that its predecessors bore. It was decided that a new colour would also be desirable to defend against improper re-use; a fugitive lilac ink was used that would run and spoil the stamp if one attempted to wash off the cancellation. The Lilacs broke the tradition of using corner letters and instead had either fourteen or sixteen dots in each corner.

== See also ==
- Postage stamps and postal history of Great Britain
