= List of Estonian postage stamps =

Eesti Post issues an average of 25–30 different stamps, souvenir sheets and booklets a year, with the total face value amounting to 150 Estonian kroons (10 euros). The most popular themes, such as Lighthouses, Manor Halls as architectural monuments, Folk Costumes, Estonian Birds, Animals, as well as Christmas stamps gave become established over time and are running into long series issued over several years. Prominent among sports stamps are those featuring Estonian Olympic Gold Medal winners. First Day Covers and Cards, Maximum Cards and Special Cancellations occupy an important place among Eesti Post philatelic products, as do various thematic and year sets.

== List of postage stamps ==
2000
2001
2002
2003
2004
2005
2006
2007
2008

- 393: Post Horn

2009

- 420: Protection of polar areas and glaciers
- 421: Paju Battle, 90th anniversary
- 422: General Johan Laidoner, 125th anniversary of birth
