= Jubilee Issue =

Stamps issued in the UK in 1887

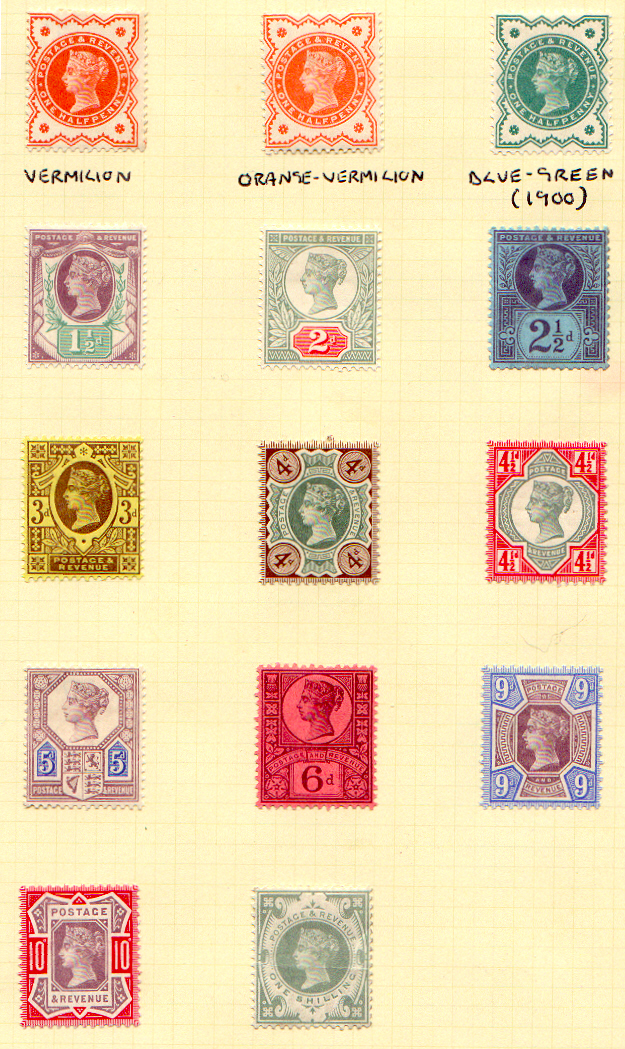
A complete set of Jubilees.

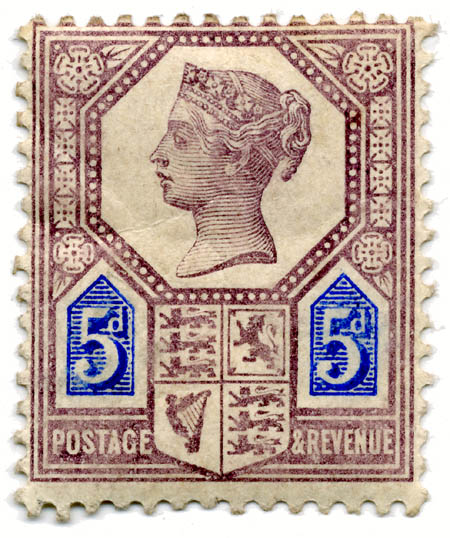
The 5-pence value includes emblems of the different nations of the UK.

The postage and revenue stamps of the United Kingdom issued in 1887 are known as the "Jubilee" issue because they were issued during the year of the Golden Jubilee of Queen Victoria to the throne in 1837. They continued in use throughout the remainder of Victoria's reign, and many of the designs were reused in the stamps of Edward VII. The Jubilee Issue includes the first British stamps to be printed in two colours.

== Origins ==
The variety of colours and designs was partly in response to the much-disliked "Lilac and Green" issues of 1883-1884. The 1884 Stamp Committee was formed to make decisions about improved replacements. After several meetings, and considering a number of essays by De La Rue (many of which survive in the marketplace), they produced a report recommending the use of surface printing, two colours in fugitive inks, coloured paper, and the dropping of the corner letters that had distinguished stamps on the sheet.

== Issue ==
The 1887 issue generally followed the Committee's recommendations and the 1/2d, 1 1/2d, 2d, 2 1/2d, 3d, 4d, 5d, 6d, 9d and 1s values were put on sale 1 January 1887. A 10d value followed on 24 February 1890 and the 4 1/2d value on 15 September 1892. The stamps continued in use largely unchanged, though specialists identify shade variations, to the end of the century. From 17 April 1900, the halfpenny value was reprinted in blue-green, and the one-shilling value went to a two-colour scheme of carmine rose and green from 11 July 1900.

== Values ==
Because of the lengthy period of use, the lower values of the issue are still quite common today and used copies are worth only a few pennies. Higher values generally rise in price according to the denomination, topped by an unmounted mint 1-shilling value, at about £150.

== Errors ==
There are many known errors of this issue:

- The 1/2d exists with printing on the gummed side, with double impressions and is imperforate.
- The 1 1/2d exists with the purple part of the design printed twice.
- The 2 1/2d can be found with printing on the gummed side and missing the 'd' in the value.

The 1/2d, the 1 1/2d, the 2d, the 2 1/2d, the 3d, the 4d and the 10d all exist as imperforate stamps.

As well as this, all the stamps can be found with their watermarks inverted and with a "SPECIMEN" overprint. Most of the stamps in this issue can be found with slight colour variations and two different dies also exist.
