= Mail delivery by animal =

Form of mail delivery

Homing pigeons have been used to deliver small messages since the time of the Persians.

Mail delivery by animals has been used in many countries throughout history. It used to be the only way to quickly transport large bundles of letters over long distances, until motorised vehicles became more widespread. Mail is still delivered by animals in a few remote locations that lack vehicular road access.

The term "snail mail" is a derogatory retronym used to refer to the delivery of letters in contrast to the immediacy of electronic mail.

== Camels ==
In Australia, camels were used to transport mail and supplies from Oodnadatta to Alice Springs until around 1929 when the railroad superseded it. The journey of around 520 kilometers took Afghan cameleers (Muslims and expert cameleers came from around the British Empire, mainly from Afghanistan and Pakistan, signed a 3 years contract and often married and created families in Australia) around four weeks. The service was celebrated by descendants of the cameleers in 2002.

== Dogs ==
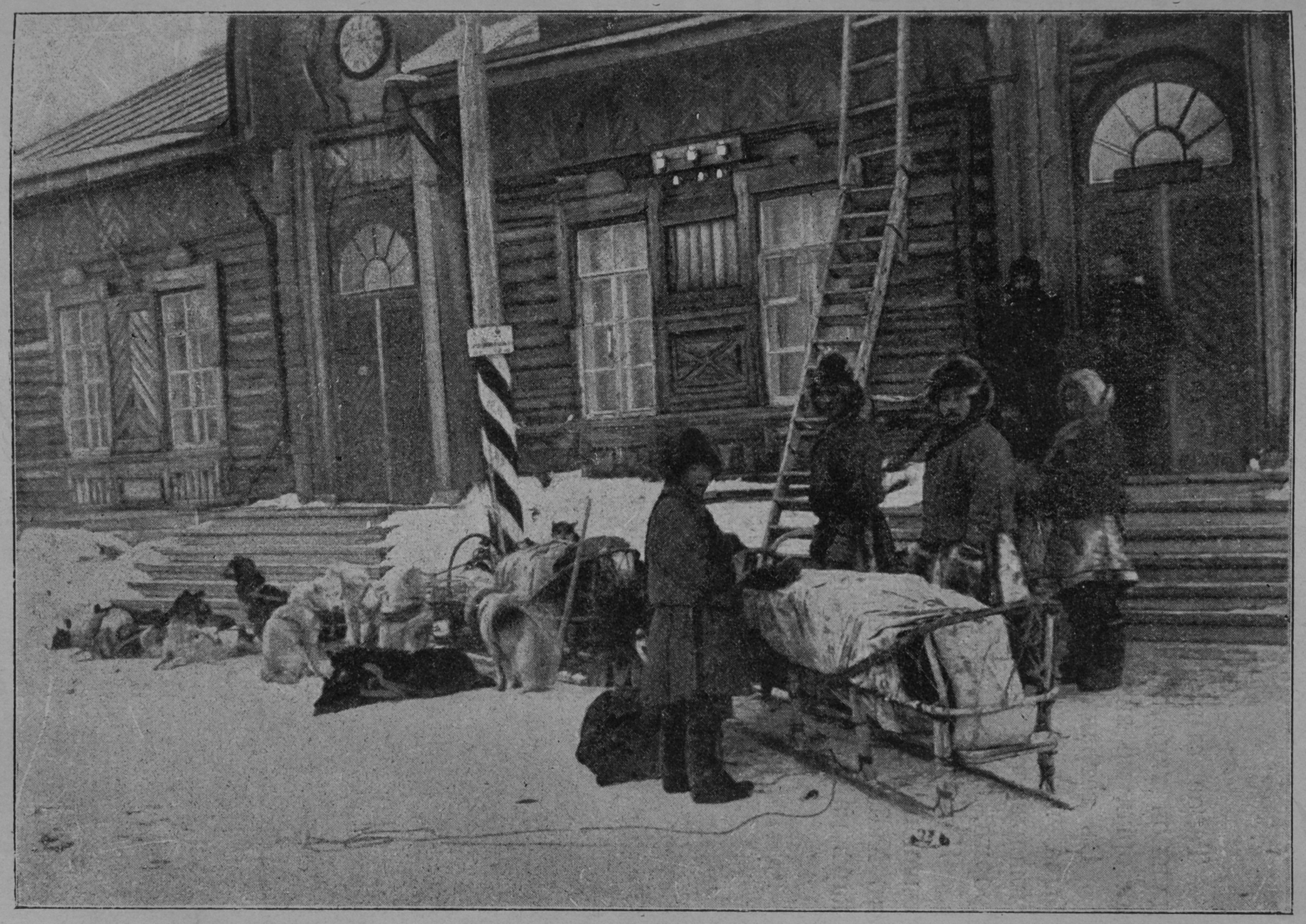
Dogsled mail in Sakhalin, Russian Empire

Dogs were used to deliver mail when pulling a dogsled. Dogsled mail saw limited use in the northern parts of Alaska and Canada during the Klondike Gold Rush (1896–1903). In the early years of Alaska settlement, there was no regular mail service to the interior post offices during the winter months (October to May), although individuals might agree to transport letters to coastal areas. Regular service seems to have begun around the 1910s, replaced in the 1930s by small aircraft. Postmasters were still allowed to use dogs for "emergency mail service", and in the 1940s cachets were produced reading "Alaska Dog Team Post" and depicting a team. The last regular-scheduled dog team route was shut down in 1963, when Chester Noongwook of Savoonga on St. Lawrence Island retired his team.

Dogsled mail also saw limited use in the northern parts of Russia during the first half of the 20th century. When there was sufficient ice buildup, Sakhalin huskies were used to cross the Strait of Tartary and mushers would note the ability of the dogs to navigate over ice flows during blizzards, even maintaining the correct course over the 480 kilometres (300 mi) from Nikolaevsky-on-Amur to Alexander post on Sakhalin.

In recent years, competitive dogsled races have carried some commemorative mail.

== Horses ==
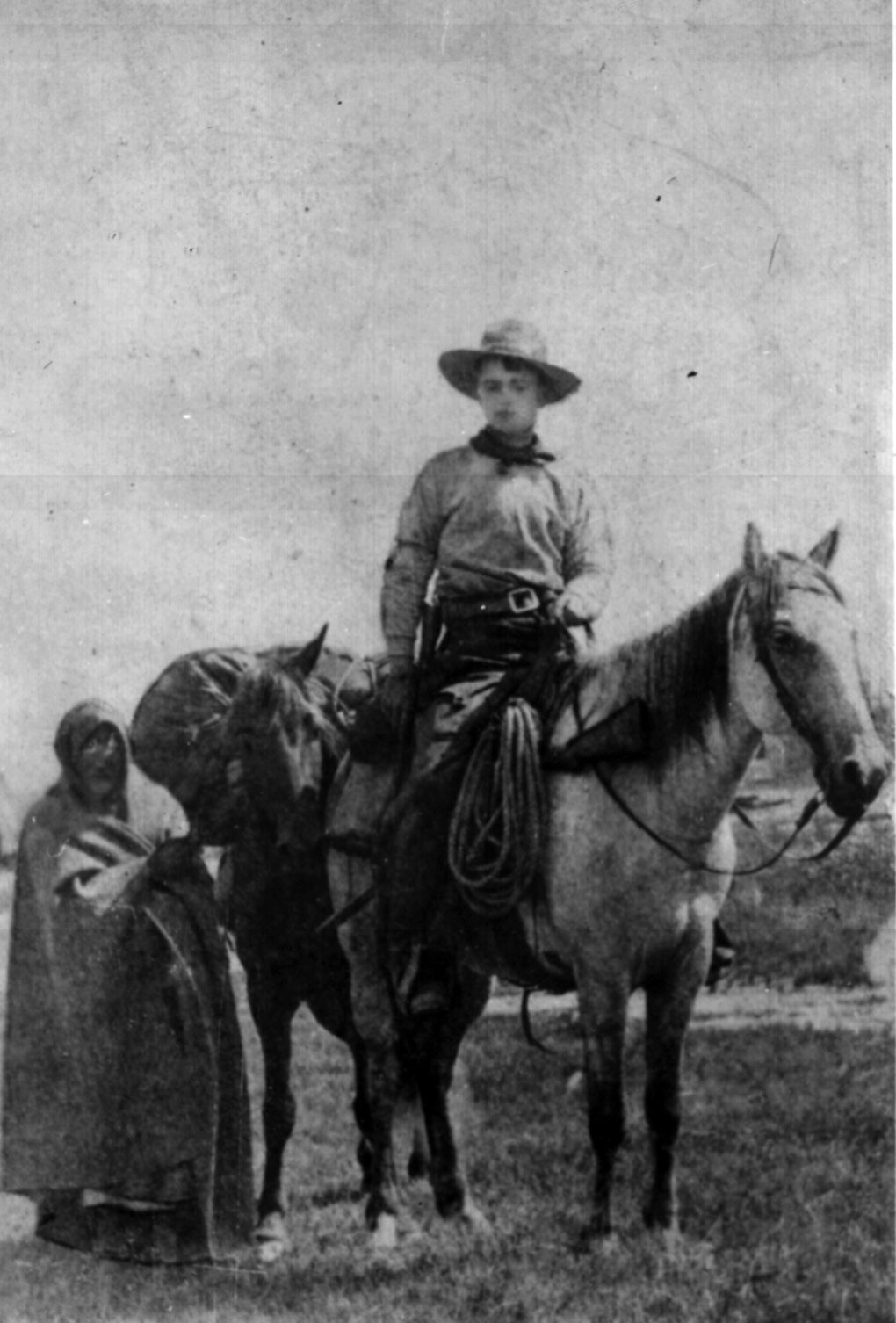
Frank E. Webner, pony express rider, ca. 1861

Horses were a primary method of delivering mail and messages for many years in different countries around the world. Riders on horseback could take small bundles quickly, while carts pulled by horses could take large amounts of mail very long distances.

Relay rider networks were a common feature of every ancient empire. They were primarily for the exclusive use of the government or military and carried no civil correspondence as a rule. Later, post riders became popular when there was an obvious demand for the transportation of public correspondence.

The Hanseatic League had a regular mounted service as early adopters the year 1274 between the principal towns of the League as well as the fortified castles which protected the merchants in their commerce. On behalf of the far-flung Habsburg dynasty of The Holy Roman Empire, Franz von Taxis set up a courier network that grew to cover all of Western Europe in the middle of the 16th century. Permanent post stations were built about a day's journey apart. Elizabethan England really started using post riders in earnest, being much more open to public use despite government restrictions.

The Pony Express was a fast mail service crossing the North American continent from the Missouri River to the Pacific coast, operating from April 1860 to November 1861. Messages were carried on horseback relay across the prairies, plains, deserts, and mountains of the western United States. It briefly reduced the time for mail to travel between the Atlantic and Pacific coasts to around ten days before being replaced by the First transcontinental railroad and the telegraph.

Regular mail delivery is now provided by horses in limited areas where other forms of transportation are not practical. For example, some towns in mountainous parts of Sichuan and Tibet, in China, are served by horse couriers. The village of Supai, in the bottom of the Grand Canyon of Arizona, United States, is served by a regular mule train from the canyon's rim.

== Birds ==
The use of homing pigeons to carry messages is as old as the ancient Persians from whom the art of training the birds probably came. The Greeks conveyed the names of Olympic victors to their various cities by this means. The Dutch government established a civil and military system in Java and Sumatra early in the last century, the birds being obtained from Baghdad. Details of the employment of pigeons during the siege of Paris in 1870–71 led to a revival in the training of pigeons for military purposes.

Numerous societies were established for keeping pigeons of this class in all important European countries; and, in time, various governments established systems of communication for military purposes by pigeon post. When the possibility of using the birds between military fortresses had been thoroughly tested attention was turned to their use for naval purposes, to send messages from the coast to ships at sea.

Pigeons have also been used by news agencies, such as Reuters, and by private individuals. Governments have in several countries established lofts of their own. Laws have been passed making the destruction of such pigeons a serious offense; premiums to stimulate efficiency have been offered to private societies, and rewards given for destruction of birds of prey. Pigeons have been used by newspapers to report yacht races, and some yachts have actually been fitted with lofts.

== Reindeer ==
From around 1899, reindeer were used to deliver mail in Alaska for the U.S. postal service. The first route was established by Sheldon Jackson and ran from St. Michael to Kotzebue, with another managed by William Kjellmann going between Unalakleet and Nome. Distances of 30–50 miles were covered by the service, with the reindeer carrying up to 300 pounds (140 kg) of mail.

== Cats ==
In the 1870s, a satirical article by William L. Alden in the New York Times claimed that cats were being trained in Liège, Belgium to deliver mail to replace homing pigeons. After the article was widely and uncritically reported in the late 2010s, the Belgian broadcaster RTBF in 2023 published an analysis of the urban legend, which also highlights the real-life role that cats have played in keeping post offices free of rodents which can damage mail.

== See also ==
- List of philatelic topics
- Airmail
- Rocket mail
- Pasilalinic-sympathetic compass
