= Disinfected mail =

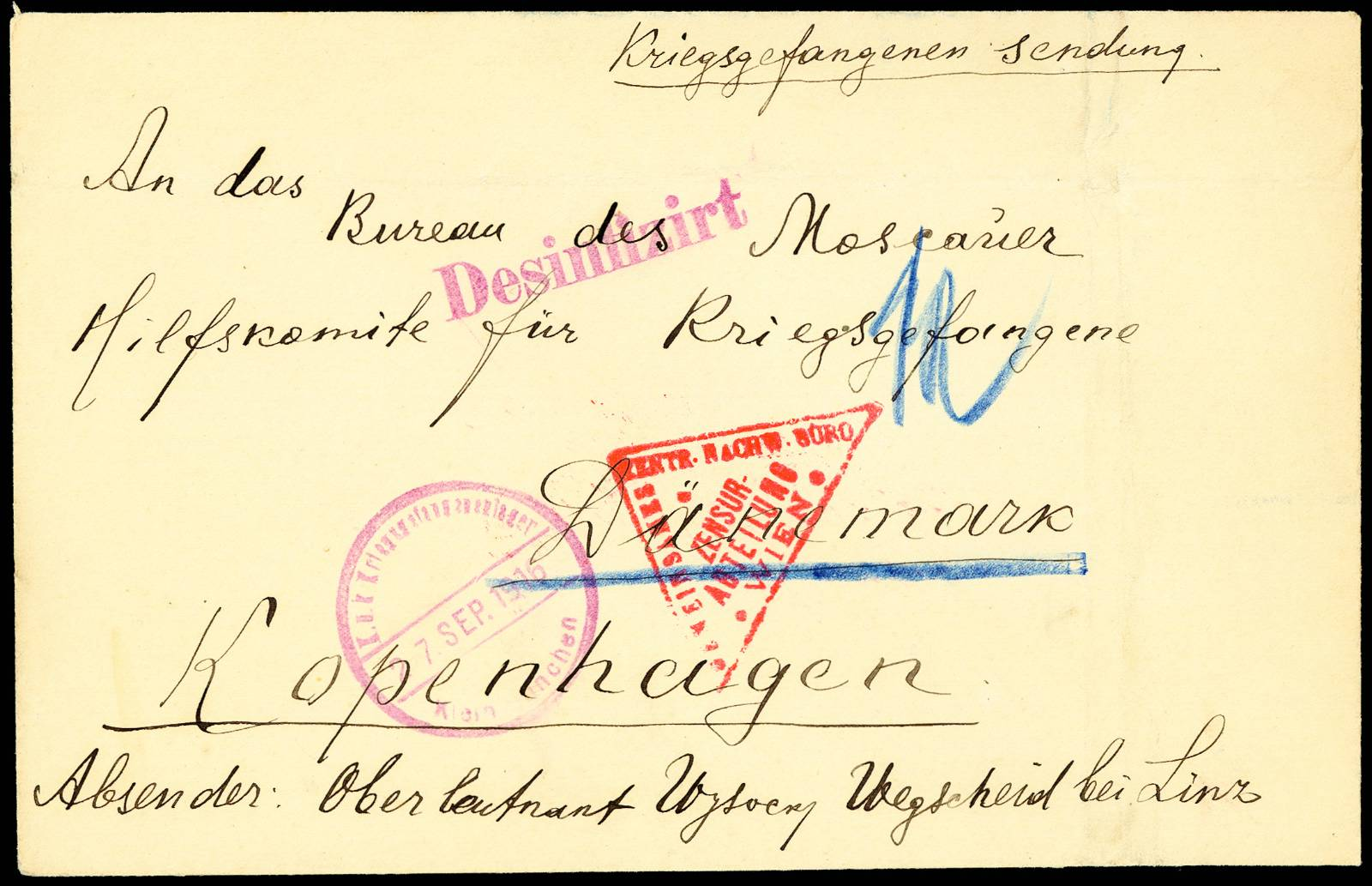
1916 disinfected PoW cover from interned Russian in Linz handstamped Desinfizirt

Disinfected mail or fumigated mail is mail that has had some form of disinfection or fumigation applied to it by postal authorities, with the intention of preventing the spread of epidemics via letters sent from infected areas.

The usual practice was to puncture the envelope with small holes, often in a grid pattern, or to snip off one or more corners, in order to let the fumigation gases in. In addition, a special postal marking may note the disinfection process.

The process did not necessarily have a scientific basis; the practice dates from before an understanding of the cause of contagious diseases, and the fumigant was as likely to be based on folklore. For instance, in the Middle Ages Mediterranean ports such as Venice would smoke received covers or douse them with vinegar.

The cholera pandemics of the early 19th century led to widespread treatment of mail, although the concern had died down by the 1840s. Mail from the tropics, particularly Hawaii, was treated against yellow fever. Following the 1898 war in Cuba, the US military government in occupation instigated several policies to reduce the endemic yellow fever problem including disinfection of mail. In the 20th century some mail was heat-treated to prevent the spread of smallpox.

Most countries have instituted mail fumigation at one point or another, and investigation of the specific incidents is an active area for postal history; the Disinfected Mail Study Circle publishes about 100 pages of original research each year in its journal Pratique.

An instance of double disinfection took place in 1900 with the fumigation with sulphur dioxide of mail from the leper settlement of the island of Molokai and the mail was further fumigated with formaldehyde when it was received in Honolulu. However no instance of infection of post office employee was recorded even though they had handled such non-disinfected leper mail for years.

Irradiated mail is a form of disinfected mail adopted in the United States, in response to the 2001 anthrax attacks.
