= Kiloware =

Bulk stamp material sold by weight

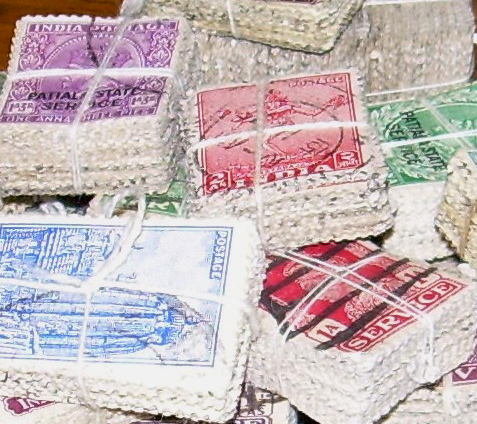
Bundlewared old postage stamps of India.

Kiloware is a term for postage stamps sold to stamp collectors by weight rather than individually or by quantity. This is often in kilograms, hence the name. Kiloware usually consists of used stamps on paper from mail clippings, although off paper stamps may also be sold as kiloware.

Mission kiloware, or a mission mixture, is kiloware put together by charitable organizations, churches, etc., whose volunteers gather used stamps and then sell them to dealers or collectors. Mission kiloware will normally have high duplication of common letter rate definitives, but good mission kiloware will be advertised as "unpicked", meaning the scarcer or better stamps will not have been removed from the mix, and there is at least the possibility of the collector finding good stamps for a low price.

A category which has disappeared in recent years is bank mix, which as the name implies was stamps gathered in banks where they tended to have high value mail, hence often higher denomination stamps.

The stamp newspaper Linn's Stamp News has a regular feature entitled "Kitchen Table Philately", in which the reviewer buys mixtures from various dealers, and analyzes what is in the mixtures, noting percentage of duplicates, oldest and newest stamps, better stamps, and concluding with a computation of the cost-to-value ratio. Typical numbers are in the 5% percent range, meaning that the stamps cost a small fraction of their price when sold individually by dealers.

== References and sources ==
- Richard McP. Cabeen, Standard Handbook of Stamp Collecting (Collectors Club, 1979), pp. 8–9
