= Fancy cancel =

Artistic postal cancelation

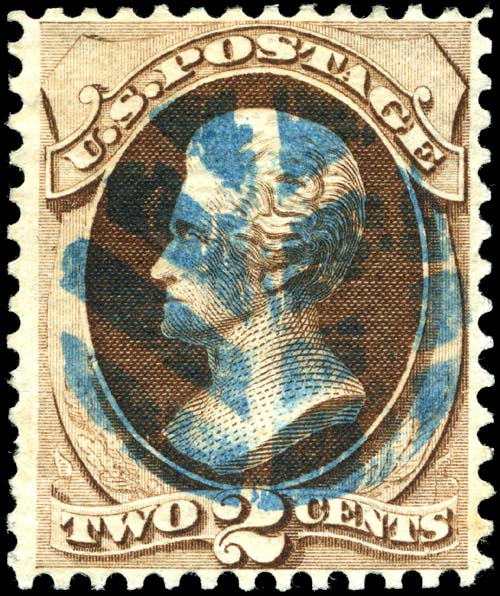
US 2-cent stamp of 1870, cancelled with a leaf shape in blue ink

A fancy cancel is a postal cancellation that includes an artistic design. Although the term may be used of modern machine cancellations that include artwork, it primarily refers to the designs carved in cork and used in 19th century post offices of the United States.

When postage stamps were introduced in the US in 1847, postmasters were required to deface them to prevent reuse, but it was left up to them to decide exactly how to do this, and not infrequently clerks would use whatever was at hand, including pens and "PAID" handstamps left over from the pre-stamp era.

A number of offices began to use cork bottle stoppers dipped in ink. These worked well, but would tend to blot out the entire stamp making it difficult to check the denomination, and so clerks began to carve a groove across the middle of the cork, making two semicircles. Further enhancements included two grooves cut crosswise (the four-piece "country pie"), and then two more, for the eight-segment "city pie", and notches cut out of the outer edge to lighten the cancel further.

The carving process seems to have sparked the creativity of clerks across the country, and soon thousands of designs appeared, ranging from shields to skulls to stars, geometrical shapes, animals, plants, and devils with pitchforks. Among the most common fancy cancel designs are stars and crosses of varying designs. The Waterbury, Connecticut post office was the master of the practice, and turned out new cancels for every holiday and special occasion. Their "Waterbury Running Chicken" cancel, perhaps a turkey since it appeared close to Thanksgiving of 1869, was in use for only a few days and is now the most prized of all 19th century cancels, with covers fetching very high prices.

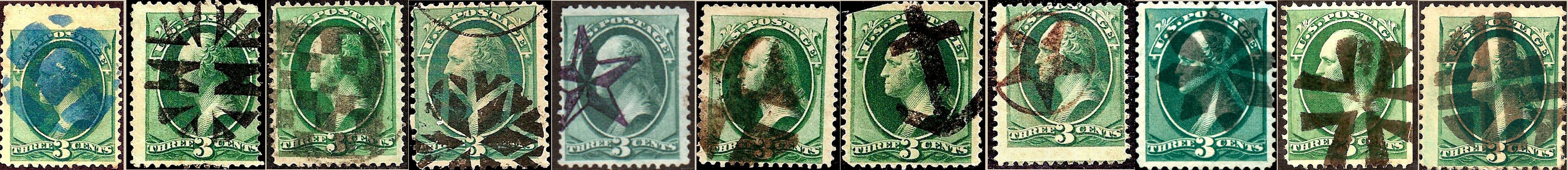
Assorted Fancy Cancels, 1870s

The era of fancy cancels came to an end in the 1890s, when the Post Office Department issued new regulations standardizing the form of cancellations.

The fancy cancels have since been studied and categorized by specialists. Many types are quite common, and command only a small premium, while others are rare. Not all have been discovered yet; previously unknown cancels continue to surface regularly.

Fancy cancels exist for many other countries besides the US. Outside the US they are normally termed cork cancellations. Canadian cork cancellations are famous for their fancy designs. Cork cancellations can be found on stamps issued by British Colonies including the Cape of Good Hope.

== Sources ==
- Herst and Sampson, 19th Century Fancy Cancels (1963, 1972)
- James Cole, Cancellations of the Banknote Era 1870-1894
- Skinner and Eno, United States Cancellations 1845-1869
