= Chalky paper =

Type of paper for stamps

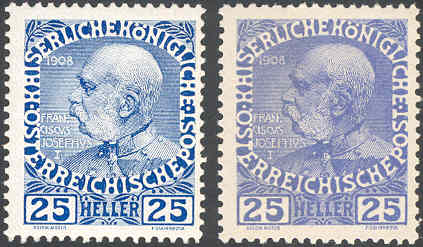
Example of a stamp (from an Austrian series printed 1908 to 1916), printed on ordinary paper (on left) and on chalky paper (on right)

In philately, chalky paper is a type of paper coated with a chalky solution for security purposes. The postmark cannot be removed without damaging the surface of the stamp thus discouraging erasure of cancellations and fraudulent reuse of stamps. The paper was first coated with a chalk-like powder, and the ink for the stamp was then impressed upon the paper. Collectors are cautioned not to attempt to remove a stamp printed on chalky paper from an envelope or paper backer by soaking it in fluid, as this may destroy the stamp's design. A simple test for chalky paper is to rub a silver coin over it, resulting in a "pencil" type mark.
