= Mixed franking =

Usage of postage stamps from multiple polities

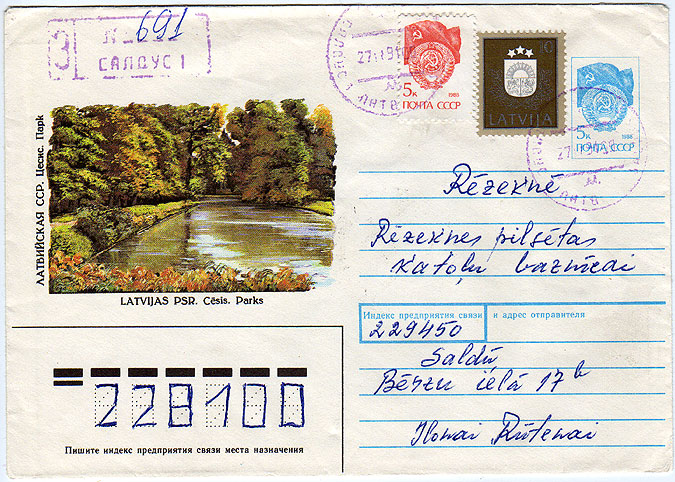
Registered cover with mixed franking of two issuing entities. 5 kopecks Soviet stationery, 5 kopecks Soviet postage stamp and 10 kopecks Latvian postage stamp, postmarked 27 November 1991, just a few months after the recognition of Latvian independence by the Soviet Union.

In philately, a mixed franking is an occurrence of postage stamps of more than one country or issuing entity on a single cover, or the occurrence of postage stamps of more than one currency of a country or issuing identity on a single cover. Since nearly all countries of the world have agreed to deliver each other's mail, it is unusual to need more than the stamps of the originating country; valid mixed frankings are uncommon and valued by collectors.

Before the advent of the Universal Postal Union in 1874, sending international mail was quite an adventure; it might be necessary to affix the stamps of the destination country in addition to those of the origin, and in the worst cases, possibly for several other countries along the way. Sometimes the letter was held until the recipient brought stamps, they were affixed and cancelled, and the result handed to the recipient. Since this only happened during the first few decades of stamp usage, and only for the few letters that were sent great distances, very few covers have survived. For some combinations, only single examples have survived, and command spectacular prices among collectors.

Another form of mixed franking occurs in transitional periods, such as after the Irish Free State's establishment from the United Kingdom in 1922 and 1923. This can be either as a way to help the public use up the stamps of a defunct government, or involuntarily as a propaganda tool.

An example of involuntary mixed franking is when Germany took over Austria in the Anschluss in 1938; during the several months while Austrian stamps were still accepted, Austrians sending mail to Germany were required to include a German stamp on the envelope.

Sometimes illegitimate mixed frankings occur when a postal user adds another country's stamps to an envelope just for fun. Many countries' postal regulation require clerks to refuse to handle these, even if the correct postage of the country is present, because they slow down the sorting process, but such covers can still get through the system.
