= Paste-up pair =

Pair of stamps straddling the join in coil stamp printing

The production of the first coil stamps, dating in the United States from 1908, began with the flat-plate-press printing of normal stamp sheets which contained the standard 400 images. The sheets were then gummed, perforated in one direction only, and cut in the other direction into twenty strips consisting of twenty stamps apiece. Strips would subsequently be pasted together to produce coils of 500 or 1000 stamps. At each join, the paper from the end of one strip would overlap the beginning of the next (the overlap is termed a "paste-up tab"). A pair of stamps that straddles the join is known as a paste-up pair.

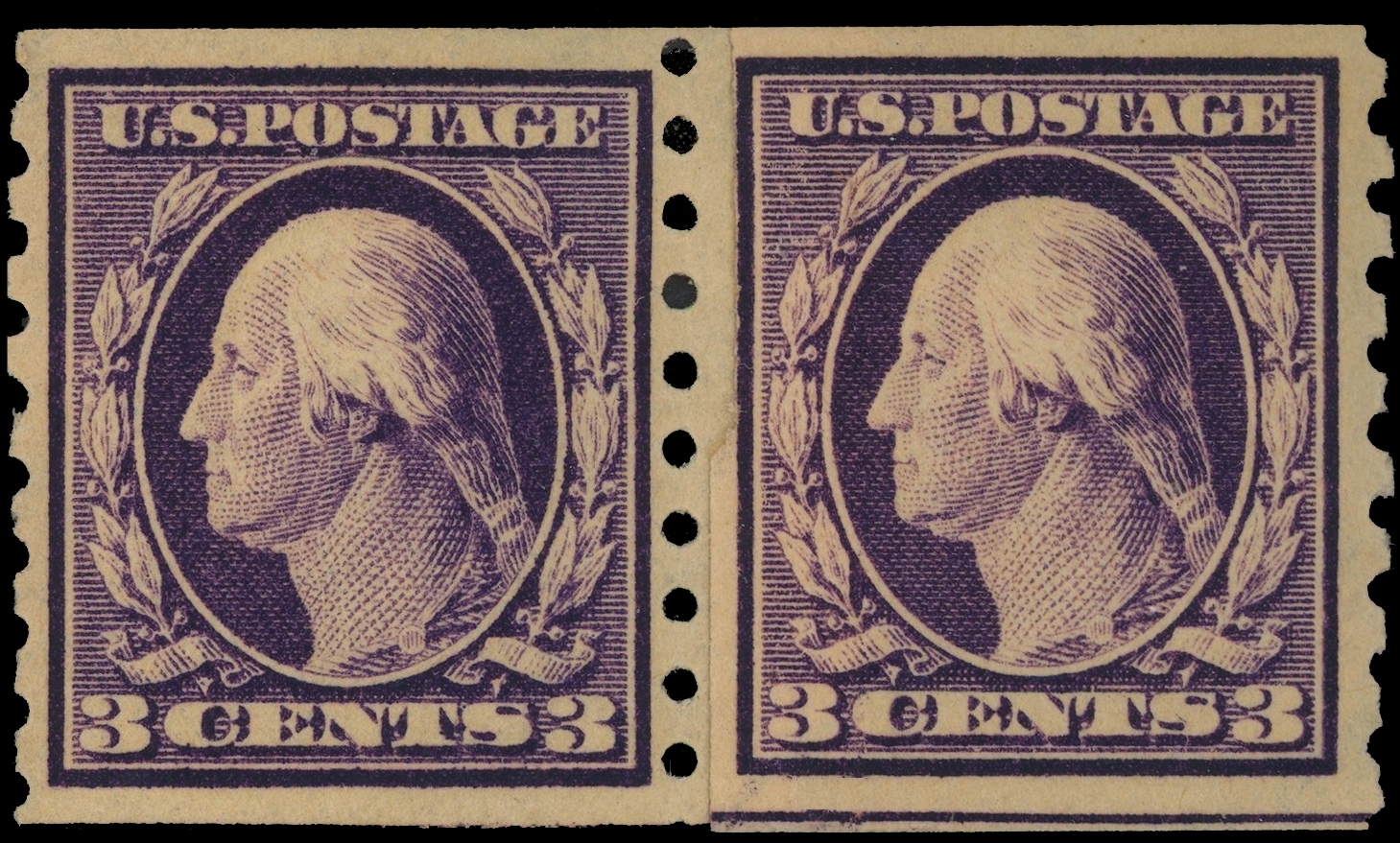
U.S. Paste-up pair, 1912

In the mid-1920s, rotary presses came into use for printing stamps which used long rolls of paper rather than individual sheets, and this made the paste-up phase unnecessary, as sheets of any length could be produced by the press and merely needed to be cut into strips.
