= Line pair =

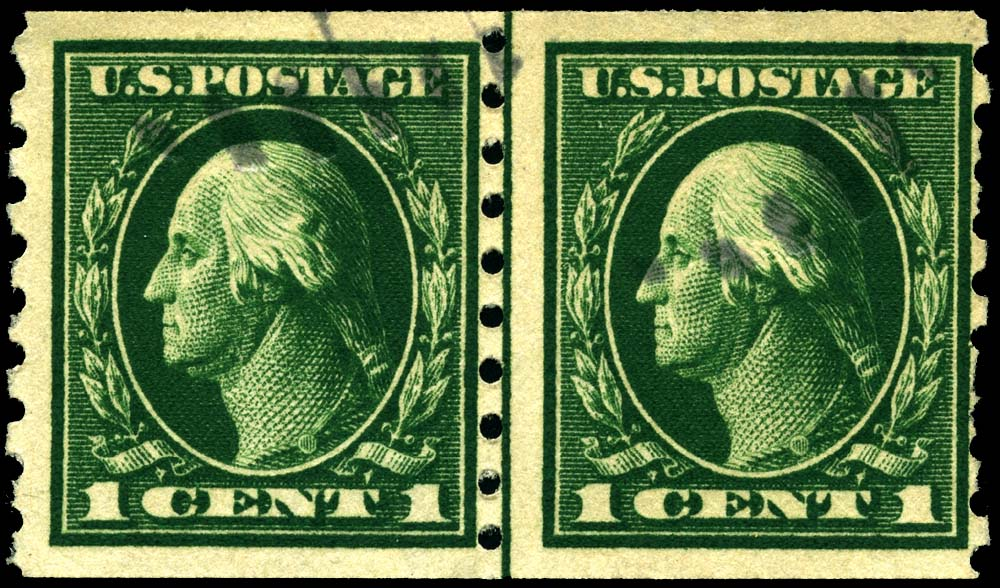
Guide line pair

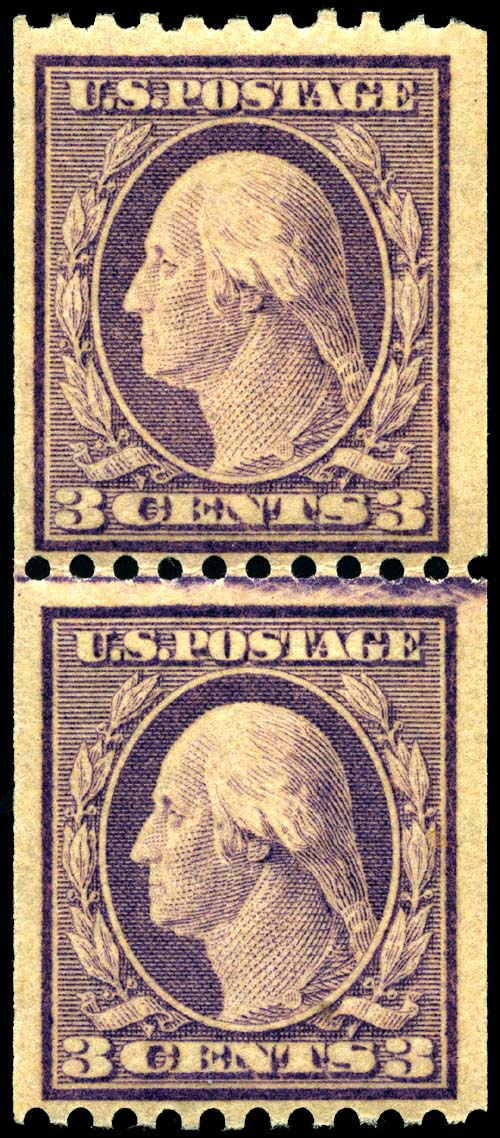
Joint line pair

In philately, a line pair is a coil pair of postage stamps bearing an inked line between the two stamps. There are at least two kinds of these:

- A guide line pair has a guide line between the stamps. Since the guide lines are deliberately incised into the plate, they will generally be sharp and clear.
- A joint line pair has a joint line between the stamps, deriving from the seam in the cylindrical plate used to print the stamps. These lines are somewhat smeared in appearance.

Since line pairs tend to be rarer, collectors are often willing to pay more money for them.
