= Special handling =

Special mail service introduced by the United States Post Office Department in 1925

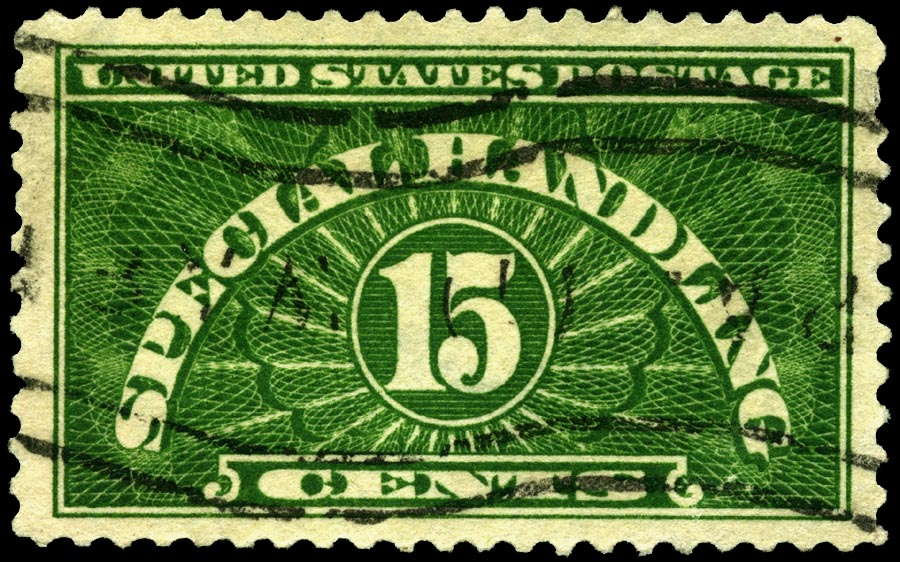

Special handling originated as a service that secured accelerated processing of fourth class mail (mostly parcels), so that it would be delivered as promptly as first-class material. This was to protect perishable items, with specific mention of live animals, from loss in the mails. It was considered a separate service from special delivery.

The United States Post Office Department introduced this service in 1925, and provided a deep green 25¢ Special Handling postage stamp for it. As rates changed, three additional U. S. Special Handling stamps (10¢, 15¢ and 20¢) appeared 1928. Except for the given value, the basic colors and designs of all the Special Handling stamps were identical.

The three latter denominations, as well as a second issue of the 25¢ stamp printed earlier in 1928, appear more yellow-green in tone than the original 1925 issue. In addition, various minor plate variations exist through the series, and the 1940 printings of the three lower values (the 25¢ stamp had been withdrawn late in 1928) are somewhat greener in appearance. However, catalogs normally list only the two 25¢ stamps as having noticeable color varieties. Finally, the three lower denominations were reissued in dry printings in 1955. This led to slight differences in the stamps' gum, paper and design sizes, and specialized catalogs may show them as sub-varieties.

While the stamps were withdrawn in 1959, today (2015) the USPS provides this expedited delivery of packages by other means: through first class parcel service and priority mail. Special handling still exists, but is now more restrictively defined: it "provides preferential handling, but not preferential delivery, to the extent practicable in dispatch and transportation." This service is primarily recommended for the delivery of live poultry, bees and similar cargo versus the delivery of non-living goods. Postal employees will take care to ensure that the special handling package is not crushed or handled roughly during delivery.
