= Postal Stationery Society of Great Britain =

The Postal Stationery Society of Great Britain was formed in April 1941, with the aim of encouraging philatelists to collect and study postal stationery, in addition to the accepted hobby of stamp collecting. The Society had about 20 members in the beginning, some of whom carried out detailed research on issues of postal stationery from many different postal administrations, while others sent in questions on material they had bought and would like to find out more. All this was reported in the Society's newsletters which were issued 2 or 3 times per annum in the early years, and more frequently later on. The newsletters were duplicated sheets of paper, initially one foolscap sheet for each issue, although this later became two sheets per issue. Copies of these newsletters are held in the libraries of the Postal Stationery Society and the Royal Philatelic Society London.

From these newsletters the Society appears to have been run entirely by post, with no official meetings taking place.

Members were advised of the various catalogues that included items of postal stationery in their listings. Stanley Gibbons had stopped listing postal stationery in its comprehensive catalogues at the beginning in 1900. So collectors of postal stationery, of whatever country, had to look elsewhere, which is where the Society was able to help.

The Society's newsletters included short articles on various aspects of postal stationery issues, the first of these newsletters was published in February 1942 on the subject of British King George V embossed registration envelopes. Many more articles followed in subsequent issues.

In October 1948, having created 29 issues of their newsletter, the Society decided to amalgamate all future issues with the Essex Philatelic Contact. No information is available about when the original Postal Stationery Society of Great Britain was wound up.

This Society has no connection the current Postal Stationery Society which shares the same name and was formed in 1992.
