= Carrier's stamp =

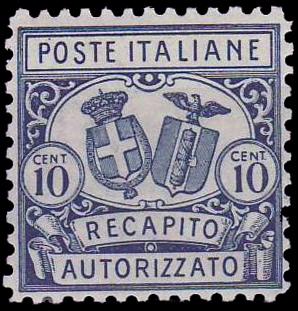
First carrier stamp of Italy, 1928

Carrier's stamp is a type of postage stamp used by private mail carriers to deliver mail directly to an addressee from the post office.

== History ==
When the postal service was first organized, the delivery of mail was only from one post office to another post office and not directly to the addressee. This created the need for private mail carriers.

In the United States, this specialized category of stamps existed mainly from 1842 to 1860.
