= Penny Lilac =

British postage stamp (1881)

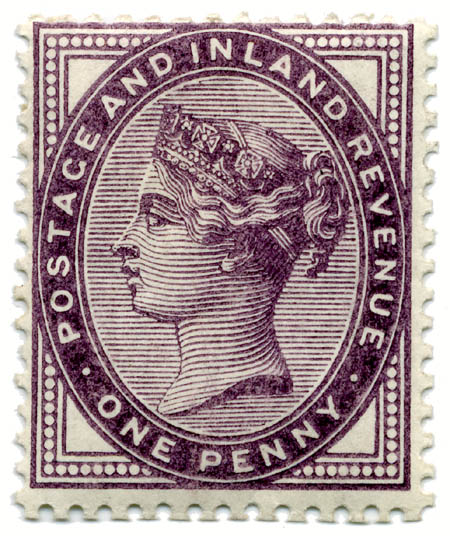
- Country of production: Great Britain
- Date of production: 12 July 1881; 144 years ago to 1891; 135 years ago
- Depicts: Queen Victoria
- Face value: 1d

The Penny Lilac was the basic penny postage and revenue stamp of the United Kingdom from its first issue on 12 July 1881 until 1901. It superseded the short-lived Penny Venetian Red because the Customs and Inland Revenue Act 1881 necessitated new stamps that were valid for use as both postage and revenue stamps, and so the Penny Lilac was issued in that year, inscribed "POSTAGE AND INLAND REVENUE". All previous stamps had been inscribed merely "POSTAGE". This stamp remained the standard letter stamp for the remainder of Queen Victoria's reign, and very large quantities were printed.

The oval design of the Penny Lilac was adapted from that used for revenue stamps in Britain from the early 1860s. In that respect it represented a break with 40 years of tradition in postage stamp design. Its predecessors (the Penny Black, the Penny Red and the Penny Venetian Red) all had rectangular designs. The use of the colour lilac for low-value definitives was extended in 1884 when other low-value stamps were issued in lilac, with green then being used for higher-value stamps.

The Penny Lilac was a surface-printed stamp and was issued in two forms:

- Die I with 14 dots in each corner from 12 July 1881 (495,984,000 issued)
- Die II with 16 dots in each corner, 13 December 1881–1901 (33,600,000,000 issued)

Penny Lilac stamps are often found as perfins—that is, with initials or insignia added as perforations to mint stamps, which meant that they could not be redeemed for cash at a post office. Use of perfins was widespread in Britain from the 1860s as a precaution against theft.

== See also ==
- List of British postage stamps
- Philatelic calendar
