= Philatelic calendar =

"Philatelic calendar" can also refer to a schedule of philatelic events such as stamp club meetings, philatelic exhibitions, or auctions.

A philatelic calendar is a collection of postmarks from each day, month, and year during the period collected. The stamps collected may be limited to the stamps of one country, or even to a particular issue such as Penny Lilac. A philatelic calendar extending from the first day of issue of the Penny Black to the present would include stamps canceled on each day from May 1, 1840 to the present, about 62,000 stamps as of 2011. Only someone who possesses the sole used example of the Penny Black from May 1, 1840 could assemble a complete calendar.

== Keightley calendar ==
The Penny Lilac was the subject of a celebrated philatelic calendar collected by Walter Keightley. The stamp calendar included postmarks, many with Socked on the nose cancellations. The Keightley calendar spans the life of the penny violet from July 11, 1881 to January 1, 1902 and includes many uses of the stamp in subsequent years, the stamp was valid for postage until July 1, 1915. Keightley, born in 1897 in Illinois, began collecting stamps at the age of 7. A graduate of Carthage College and the Colorado School of Mines, Keightley spend most of his working life in England as a petroleum engineer and was an avid philatelist. After his retirement he returned to the United States and lived to 94. His collection was auctioned by Christie's in its New York sale of January 11, 12, 1991.
