= Fugitive pigment =

Impermanent pigment

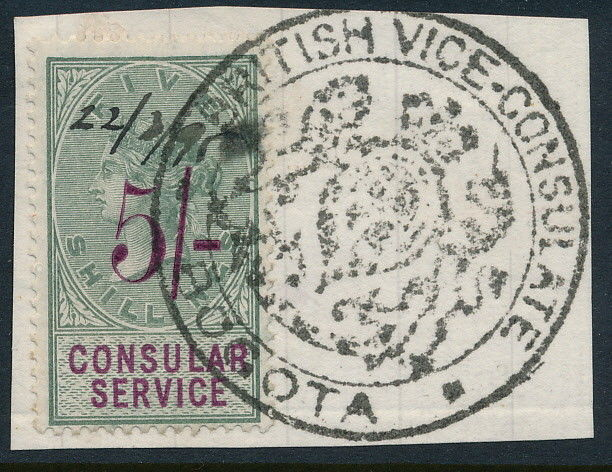
1887 British Consular Service revenue stamp printed in green fugitive ink

Fugitive pigments are impermanent pigments that lighten, darken, or otherwise change in appearance or physicality over time when exposed to environmental conditions, such as light, temperature, humidity, or pollution. Fugitive pigments are present in types of paint, markers, inks etc., which are used for temporary applications. Fugitive inks which washed away when soaked in water were sometimes used deliberately to prevent postage stamps being removed from envelopes by soaking, and reused (e.g., the Queen Victoria Lilac and Green Issue).

While permanent pigments are usually used for paintings, painters have made work wholly or partially with fugitive pigments for a number of reasons: availability and cost of pigments; being more concerned with the appearance of colors available only with fugitive pigments than with permanence; lack of knowledge regarding the deterioration of pigments; or the desire to have a painting change in appearance over time.
