= Maximaphily =

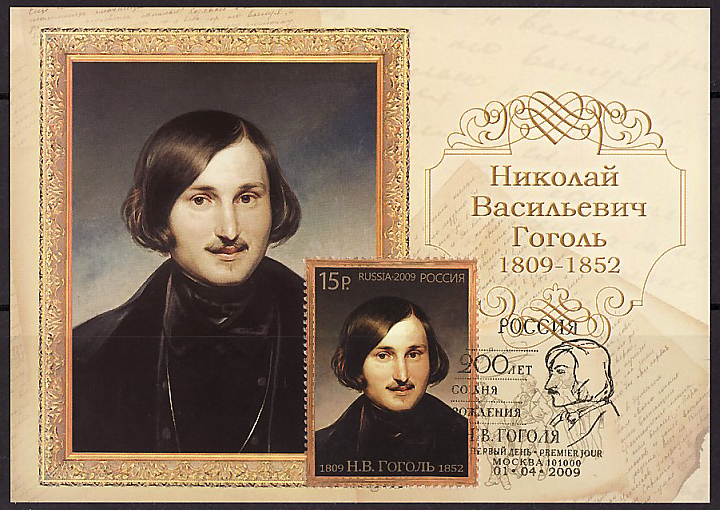
A maximum card for the birth bicentenary of Nikolai Gogol where the card, stamp and first day of issue postmark are in concordance

Maximaphily is a branch of philately involving the study and creation of maximum cards. It is one of eleven classifications of philately recognised by the Fédération Internationale de Philatélie (FIP) and therefore has its own FIP Commission.

The FIP Maximaphily Commission holds a biennial conference on the subject.

== Maximum card ==
In philately a maximum card (also known as a maxi-card, or maxicard) is a postcard with a postage stamp placed on the picture side of the card where the stamp and card match or are in maximum concordance (similarity). The cancellation or postmark is usually related to the image on the front of the card and the stamp.

Not every country issues maximum cards (e.g. US did very few) and some which do (e.g. Germany) have only a limited number of releases every year whereas others issue maximum cards for every stamp (e.g. Australia).

== History ==
Maximaphily did not become organised until after the Second World War. Before then maximum cards were created as novelties, often by tourists. Maximaphily is closely associated with thematic or topical stamp collecting and many thematic collections are enhanced with appropriate maximum cards.

== Elements ==
A maximum card (maxicard, maxi-card, MC) is made up of three elements: the postcard, the stamp and the postmark. The object of maximaphily is to obtain a card where the stamp and picture are in close concordance, ideally with an appropriate cancellation, too. If all three elements are concordant, then that card truly is a maximum [concordance] card (hence the name maximaphily). Preferably, the image on the postcard should not be simply an enlargement of the image on the stamp. There are exceptions. For example: a work of art, like a painting (not a detail of it), is often shown in its entirety, both on the postcard and on the stamp of the maxicard.

== Competitions ==
Maximaphily displays have become popular at competitive philatelic exhibitions and special rules have been developed by the FIP to assist in judging the entries.

== See also ==
- PHQ card
