= Postage stamp paper =

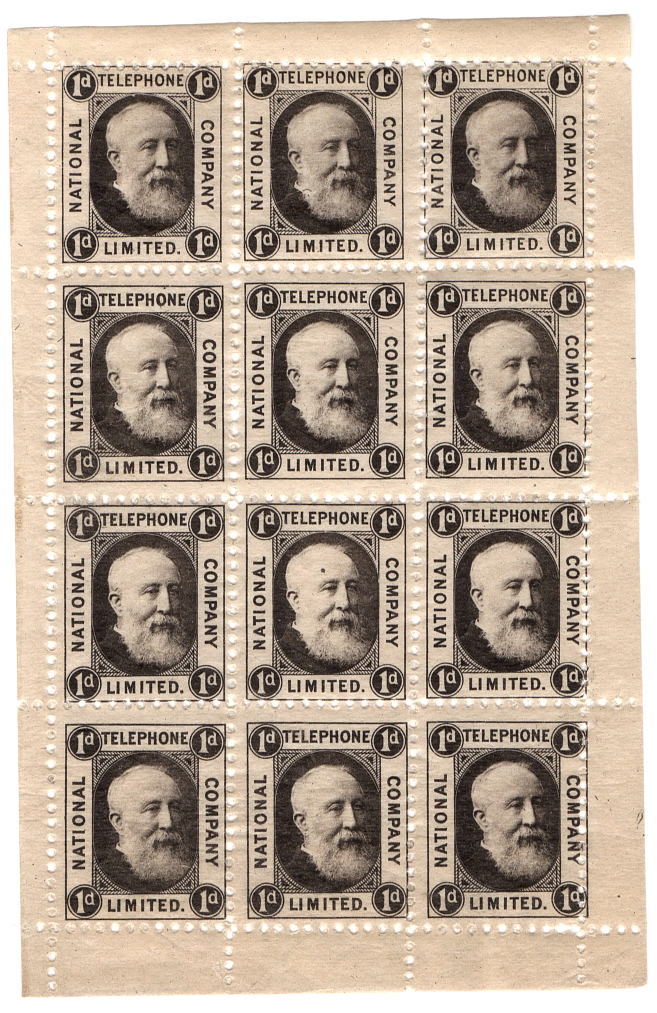
A sheet of National Telephone Company postage stamps

Postage stamp paper is the foundation or substrate of the postage stamp to which the ink for the stamp's design is applied to one side and the adhesive is applied to the other. The paper is not only the foundation of the stamp but it has also been incorporated into the stamp's design, has provided security against fraud and has aided in the automation of the postal delivery system.

Stamp catalogs like Scott's Standard Postage Stamp Catalog (SC) often document the paper the stamp is printed on to describe a stamp's classification. The same stamp design can appear on several kinds of paper. Stamp collectors and philatelists understand that a stamp's paper not only defines a unique stamp but could also mean the difference between an inexpensive stamp from one that is rare and worth more than its common counterpart.

Making an accurate determination of the stamp's paper may require special tools such as a micrometer to measure the thickness of a stamp, certain fluid chemicals to reveal hidden features, magnifying glasses or loupes to see fine details, digital microscopes to examine the minutest details of the paper or ultraviolet light to illuminate the paper to reveal its glowing aspects. Certain paper types may require the services of an expert as the only sure way of knowing the true identity of the stamp's paper.

== Paper characteristics ==
All paper is endowed with certain characteristics by its maker. Depending on the purpose of the paper, the craftsman will choose specific materials and apply certain manufacturing processes to achieve the design objectives. Characteristics such as composition, weight, color, size, watermark, surface finish, opacity, hardness and strength all have to be established before the papermaker can begin his work.

The making of paper can be broken down into three phases; the preparing of the pulp into a suspension of fibers; the forming of the paper on a mould or an endless wire mesh; and lastly the finishing of the paper's surface and drying. From a philatelic interest, it is the second phase, the forming of the paper that yields the most interesting characteristics.

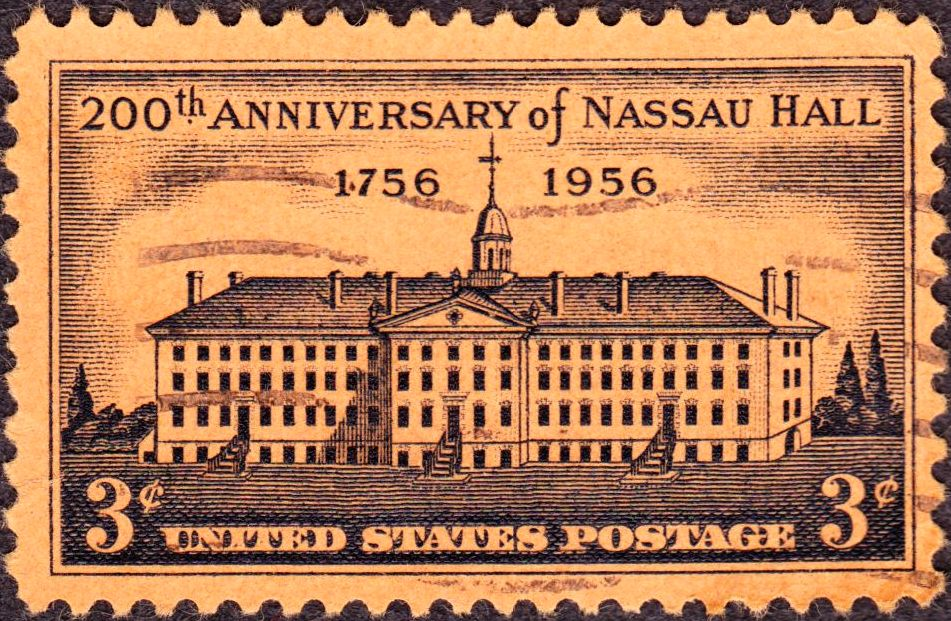
Pulp dyed orange to match Princeton University's school colors for the 1956 Nassau Hall 200th anniversary

In the first phase of papermaking the characteristics such as its composition, color and weight is determined. Paper has as its chief component, a mat of cellulose fibers. Cellulose is the skeleton structure of plant cells and can be separated from the plant for use in paper. Cellulose has several characteristics that make it desirable for paper, the foremost being its strength when formed into a mat or web. When cellulose fibers come in contact with each other in water, a bond is formed. When water is removed from the adjoining fibers, the bond between the fibers strengthens. Pulp, the collection of individual fibers, may be bleached, especially if the paper is to be dyed a different color or the paper is expected to be white. Since most paper is either printed or written upon, fillers are added to the pulp to fill the pores of the paper and sizing is added to make the fibers water resistant, yet both act as fillers. Unsized paper is blotting paper, making it unsuitable for printing. Fillers and sizing are added to the pulp to absorb the ink quickly, unlike pure cellulose. Fillers can be glues made from animal products, starches from rice or wheat, resins or gums, or minerals such as calcium carbonate, titanium dioxide or kaolin. Mineral fillers are the most common as they are very effective as a filler. When all of these ingredients are assembled, they are suspended in water, which may include a color dye, as the furnish to the second phase of papermaking.

The paper is formed in the second stage of papermaking. With handmade paper, the furnish is stored in a vat and the craftsman uses a mould to strain out enough material to form a sheet of paper. The mould determines the dimensions of the finished sheet and its weight, which ultimately establishes the paper's thickness. The mould is usually a wire mesh that acts as a strainer such that the furnish is separated out of the water. The water drains off, leaving layers upon layers of fibers or a web of paper on the mould. The texture of the paper is determined by the nature of the mould. Wove paper has a uniform texture while laid paper has a fine-lined texture created by wires that are attached to the wire mesh. If a watermark is part of the paper's design, it is the mould that creates the watermark, in the same way that the fine lines of laid paper are created. A watermark is a deliberate thinning of the paper by the placing of either wires or metal shapes, called bits, onto the wire mesh of the mould. When the mould is removed from the vat, the water drains causing the pulp to be deposited more between the wires or bits relative to the top of the bits or wires. When the dried paper is held up to a light, the thinner paper will appear lighter in contrast to the thicker paper, thus creating a watermark. Numerous countries have used a variety of designs for their watermarks as a means to prevent forgery of stamps, making the watermark of particular philatelic interest.

In comparison, machine-made paper is made on the Fourdrinier machine by drawing the furnish out of a vat onto an endless wire mesh. The paper, shortly after being drawn from the vat, is usually pressed with a Dandy roll as the mechanism to imprint a watermark onto the paper. Machine-made paper can produce single sheets of paper or one large continuous web of paper that is collected to form large rolls.

One characteristic of machine-made paper is that it creates a direction or an alignment of the fibers, which directly impacts its strength. This is of particular importance when tearing the paper, as one would do to separate a stamp for use. When the tear is aligned with the direction of the fibers, the paper will tear evenly. When the tear is opposed to the direction of the fibers, the paper will tear unevenly, in a jagged line. Handmade paper disperses the fibers in unpredictable directions and therefore yields a paper with the most overall strength. A paper's strength had an influence on the separation methods used for a stamp. For example, a stronger paper may have needed a higher number of perforations per inch to best facilitate the separation of the stamps. Similarly, many stamps have two different standards of perforation for its length and width to optimize the ease of separation while minimizing the cost of manufacturing.

In the last stage of papermaking, the paper is finished and dried. The finishing of the paper can include the application of a coating that will produce the best effects when printed upon. The coating is a fine layer of special sizing applied to one or both sides of the paper to fill in all of the pores and to smooth out the surface of the paper. A glossy appearance often is a characteristic of coated paper. Once the coating is applied, the paper making process is complete.

Certain postage stamps have been printed on security paper, which is paper that has additional characteristics coated or printed onto the paper to prevent the reuse of the postage stamp and as a means to prevent forgery.

=== Shrinkage ===
Shrinkage is a characteristic of paper because of the nature of cellulose fibers. The cellulose fiber is hygroscopic and acts like a sponge when immersed in water. The fibers expand in their width and not in their length. With handmade paper, because there is no direction associated with the fibers, the paper expands and shrinks unevenly in both the length and width of the finished sheet. With machine-made paper, because there is a direction to the fibers, the paper shrinks unevenly, that is, less in its length (in the direction of the fibers) and more in its width (in the direction opposite of the fibers). This characteristic is important to the printer because certain printing techniques required the paper to be dampened prior to printing. As such, when the paper dried, the uneven shrinkage of machine-made paper would produce an image of different proportions than the die that created it. The differences in appearance between wet and dry printed stamps can sometimes be quite noticeable, with dry printed stamps generally having sharper images on stiffer and thicker paper.

== Watermarks ==
Watermarks are created in the paper by special pieces of bent wire or bits, either attached to the mould or attached to the Dandy roll of machine-made paper. The watermark is inherently created differently by these two methods. In the case of the mould, the watermark is created by the settling of the fibers on the mould, thus creating the intentional thinning of the paper. In the case of the Dandy Roll, the watermark is pressed into the wet pulp. The papermaker closely adjusts the pressure the Dandy Roll exerts on the paper to ensure a proper impression of the watermark design into the paper. Too little pressure and the watermark may not be detectable.

Philatelically, there are several descriptive terms used to categorize watermarks.

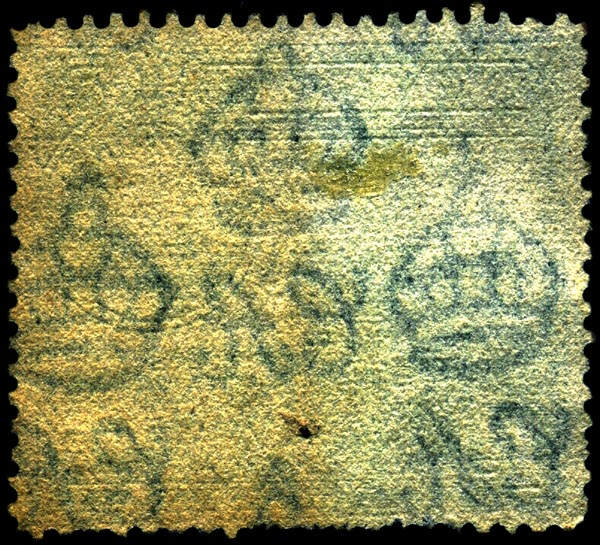
Multiple watermark when viewed from the back of the stamp.

- Simple – When the entire watermark design can be seen on each individual stamp.

- Multiple – When the watermark design can be seen several times on a single stamp or portions of several instances of the design are visible on a single stamp. For example, the watermarked stamps of Great Britain and her colonies.

- Sheet – When the watermark design is so large that it covers multiple stamps such that only a portion of the watermark design is on a single stamp. For example, on India's Coat of Arms watermark of 1854

- Paper-makers – When the watermark documents the papermaker's name, the trade name of the paper or in some instances the stamp contractor or printer. These are similar to sheet watermarks. For example, the "Harrison & Sons, London" watermark used for Maldive Islands 1933 issue.

- Stitch – The unintentional watermark that is created by the joining of the endless wire mesh belt used in machine-made papermaking.

- Marginal – When the watermark design appears in the sheet margins. Examples can be found in the many British Commonwealth issues.

- Pattern – When wavy lines, lozenges, diamond mesh and others such that the pattern is repeated evenly over the whole stamp. For example, the lozenges pattern on Germany Empire's 1905-19 issue or circles pattern on the 1920 issue.

- False – When the appearance of a watermark is created by lightly printing on the stamp. For example, the quadrille pattern printed on France's 1892 15c issue.

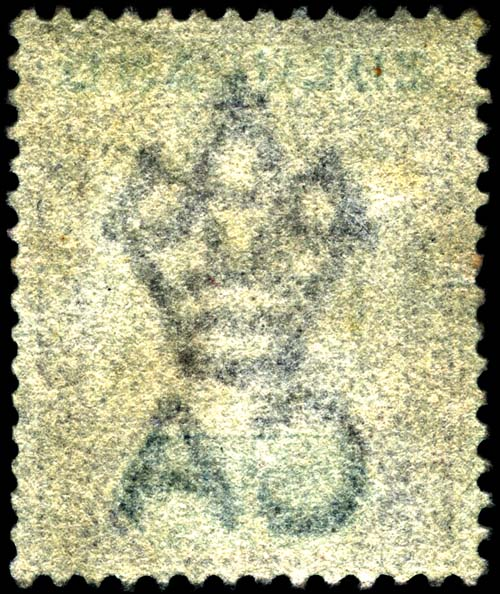
Normal and Single watermark as seen from the back of the stamp.

Lastly, by way of orientation. These designations describe the orientation of the watermark with respect to the stamp's design.

- Normal – When the watermark coincides with the design of the stamp when viewed from the front of the stamp. The watermark will be mirrored when viewed from the back of the stamp.

- Inverted – When the watermark is upside down when viewed from the front of the stamp. That is, when the stamp's printed design is right side up and the watermark design is upside down.

- Reversed – When the watermark is reversed when viewed from the front of the stamp. The watermark will be un-mirrored when viewed from the back. For example, letter watermarks would not be reversed when viewed from the back of the stamp.

- Inverted and reversed – When the watermark is both upside down and reversed when viewed from the front of the stamp.

- Sideways – When the watermark is rotated 90° with respect to the stamp's design.

=== Watermark detection ===
Watermark detection can be as simple as holding the stamp up to a light or by placing it face down on a black surface. If this does not reveal the watermark there are fluids, electrical devices and ink pads that may reveal the thinning of the paper;

- A special stamp watermark detecting fluid may be applied to a stamp lying face down in a black plastic tray. As the fluid evaporates the watermark becomes visible and as it does not contain water the fluid may be used on mint stamps without damaging the gum. A drop of benzine can also be used to coax the watermark out of the paper but care should be observed as the inks of photogravure stamps are soluble in benzine and will ruin the stamp.

- There are various mains or battery powered devices available in which the stamp is placed on a metal plate and a clear plastic block is pressed down onto it. A light is then switched on to reveal the watermark.

- With the 'Morley Bright' detector the stamp is placed face down in a unit that contains ink in a sealed sachet that flows into the watermarked area of the stamp under thumb pressure.

- There are color-filtering techniques that neutralize the color of the stamp's design, thus making it easier to see the watermark. There is a device known as the Philatector that electronically employs a set of color filters as a means to detect the watermark.

- If the reverse of a stamp is placed on a black background on a computer scanner and graphics software is used to adjust the color saturation and contrast this may in some cases increase visibility of a watermark.

== Flaws and errors ==
While the words flaws and errors as synonymous, they are used to distinctly describe either a defect in the stamp's paper or when an incorrect paper was used in the printing of the stamp. Flaws describe faults or defects in the paper of the stamp, typical of handling after manufacturing or less frequently during the manufacturing of the paper. Errors describe an incorrect type of paper used to print a stamp, typically the use of watermarked paper when it was not specified for the issue. While a paper fault represents a damaged or defective stamp that devalues its worth, paper errors have the opposite effect and are sought after by collectors.

=== Flaws ===
During the manufacturing of paper, flaws can occur in the web. One such flaw is the pinhole. The term is used to designate a small blemish typically characterized by a small hole in the substance of the paper. Pinholes are typical of very thin paper and can be found by holding the stamp up to light.

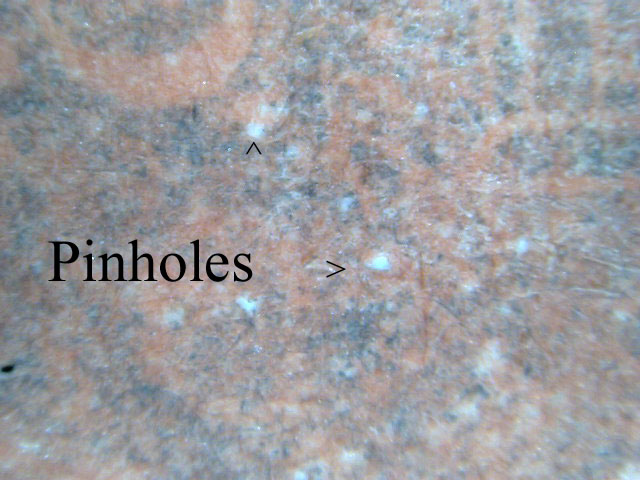
Pinholes found in an Afghanistan 1894 2 abasi stamp.

A rare flaw in paper is when the watermark bit has been improperly repaired on the Dandy roll. Great Britain's Emblems watermark is composed of two roses, one shamrock and one thistle. A defect was created when the Dandy roll was repaired and instead of a thistle bit, a rose bit was added creating the three roses and a shamrock flaw. This flaw is found on Great Britain's 1862 3d (plate 2), 1865-67 3 d (plate 4), 6 d (plates 5 and 6), 9d (plate 4) and 1s (plate 4).

Another paper flaw is a crease. A crease is when the paper becomes an overlapped fold, which subsequently is printed upon. This kind of crease is more of a printing error as it is a paper flaw. Creased stamps can also occur as a result of handling, where it's clear that the stamp has been folded.

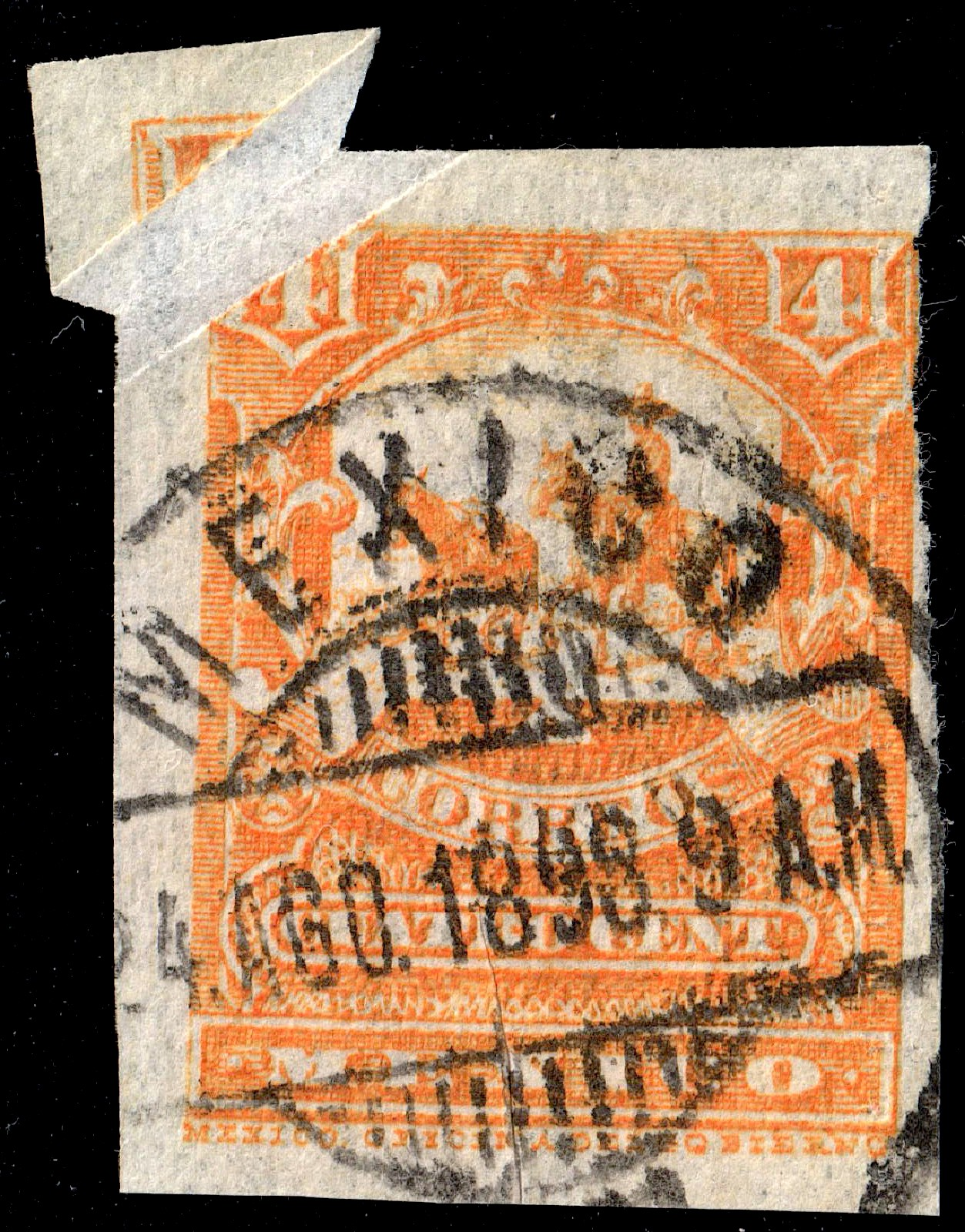
Overlapped fold found in a Mexican 1897-98 4c stamp.

Another common handling flaw is a tear. The torn stamp is usually complete but the paper is partially ripped. Tearing a piece off of the stamp, however, is how the Afghan postal clerk cancelled a stamp and so this is not a flaw but evidence that the stamp was probably postally used, especially if the stamp is still on the postal matter.

A stamp can be damaged if it is soaked off of a water-soluble colored paper. For numerous occasions, people send greeting cards in envelopes that are on colored paper. The worst offender is the red envelope. If warm water is used in soaking the stamp from the paper of the envelope, the red dye can and does bleed into the stamp's paper, leaving it tinted red. This is not a stamp variety but simply a damaged stamp. Yellow and blue dyes in colored paper bleed into a stamps too.

A thin is created when a stamp is improperly removed from the paper it was attached. Since paper is created by depositing layers of fibers onto each other to form a web, they can be separated by the layers too. When the paper is finished, the outside layers become the strongest layers. Soaking a stamp in water is the usual way of removing it from the postal matter. Water will dissolve the glue used as the adhesive but it also weakens the bonds of the paper's fibers. Just as the removal of water strengthens the bonding between fibers, adding water weakens them. A failed attempt at removing the stamp from other paper typically results in portion of the stamp's paper being left attached to the postal matter. Thins can be created in a variety of ways and all result in a damaged stamp.

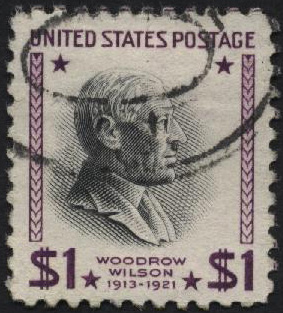
The US $1 Woodrow Wilson Presidential Series stamp

=== Errors ===
Errors of paper are created when the incorrect paper is used for the stamp's design rather than a papermaking defect. One example of this is when the watermarked paper intended for use with U.S. revenue stamps was used for the $1 Woodrow Wilson stamp (SC#832). The mistake was made sometime between 1950 and 1951 and some 160,000 to 400,000 copies are estimated to have been printed.

== Comparative paper terms ==
When the paper of the stamp is described, stamp catalogs often use words that are relative, such as thick and thin. This is done to describe the variations of the stamp's paper in a particular issue. Thick may be as much as 0.005 inches and thin as little as 0.001 inches, with medium somewhere in between.

Paper can be described as being opaque, semi-translucent and semi-transparent. The opacity of the stamp describes the ability of light to shine through the paper. If no light shines through the paper, then it is opaque. If some light passes through, in any amount, the paper is semi-translucent. Transparency describes the ability to see an object through the paper or when the paper is placed over printed letters the ability to see the printing through the paper. If the stamp's design can be seen through the back of the stamp, then it is semi-transparent.

Another comparative set of terms refers to the paper's hardness. Hard, stout hard, and soft have been used to describe the paper. Experts have described the snap of the stamp when flicked as a means to determine if the stamp was printed on hard or soft paper. A sharper snap implied hard paper because the hardness is a characteristic of the amount or kind of sizing used when making the paper.

Porous paper is used to describe paper as absorbent, usually in contrast to less absorbent paper used in the stamps of the same country. Porosity is a characteristic of paper. Wood fibers are hydrophilic or water loving. Sizing is added to paper to create a resistance to water as well as to fill in the gaps between the fibers. Porosity is a measure of how the paper responds to a liquid.

There are several popular stamp collecting terms. On-paper refers to any stamp that is still adhering to another piece of paper. Similarly, off-paper is used to describe a postally used stamp that is no longer adhering to any other kind of paper. Wallpaper is the slang name given to the sheets of stamps that have little or no philatelic or monetary value.

== Stamp paper varieties ==
Philatelically, stamp paper can be partitioned into a few large groups. The first that is typically encountered in the stamp catalogs describes the texture of the paper, such as wove or laid. Many stamps have been printed with these different paper textures. Other groups can be formed as: Colored paper, safety or security paper and coated paper.

In a stamp catalog, a stamp's paper is usually identified at the beginning of the issue. It will also be identified when the paper changes either within the issue or with the next issue. When colored paper is used for the stamp, the ink colors are listed first and then the paper's color is listed next in italics. Sometimes the paper is described as ordinary, which simply means that the common paper of the period was used. Coated paper is usually not listed but may be surmised by the printing process used to print the stamp. For example, photogravure printing yields the best clarity when printed on coated papers.

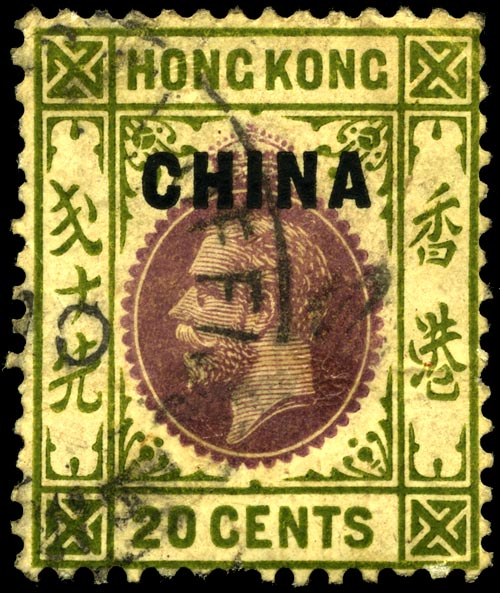
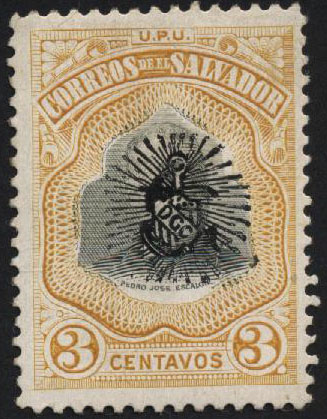
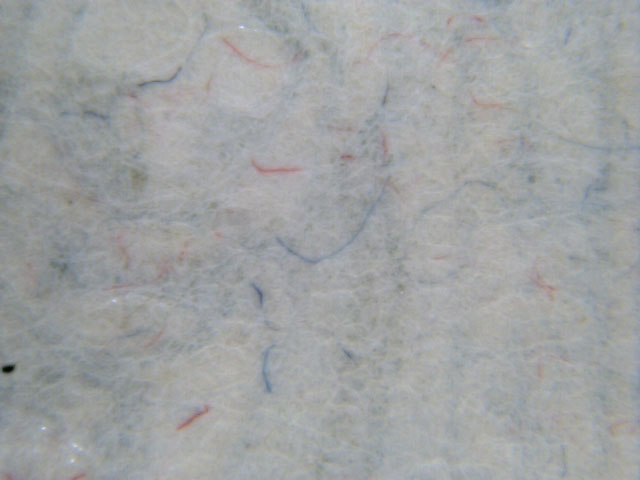
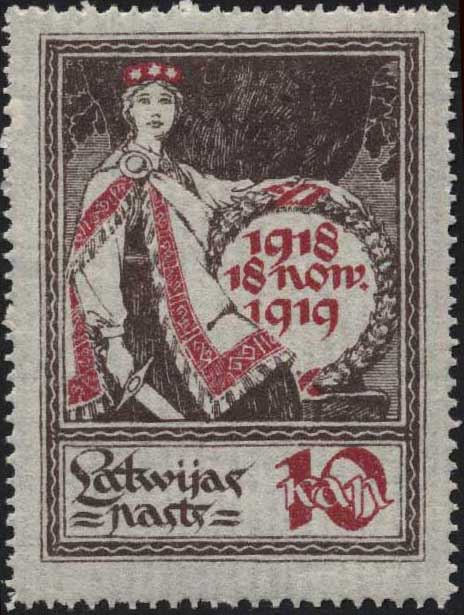
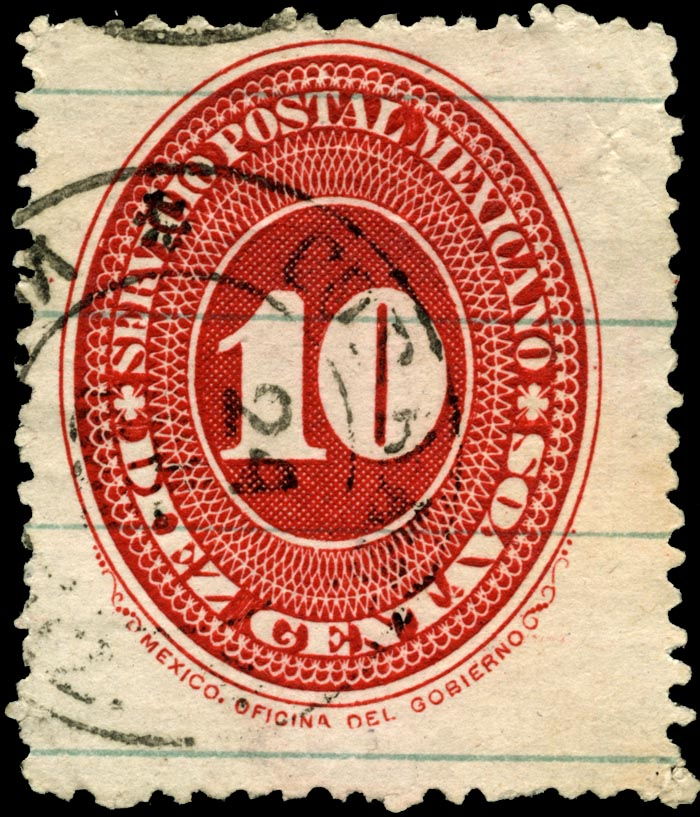
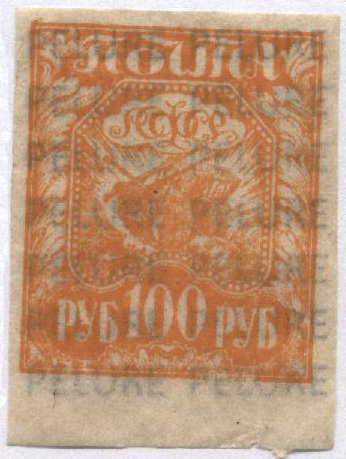
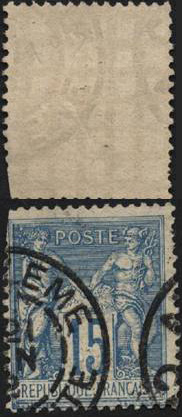
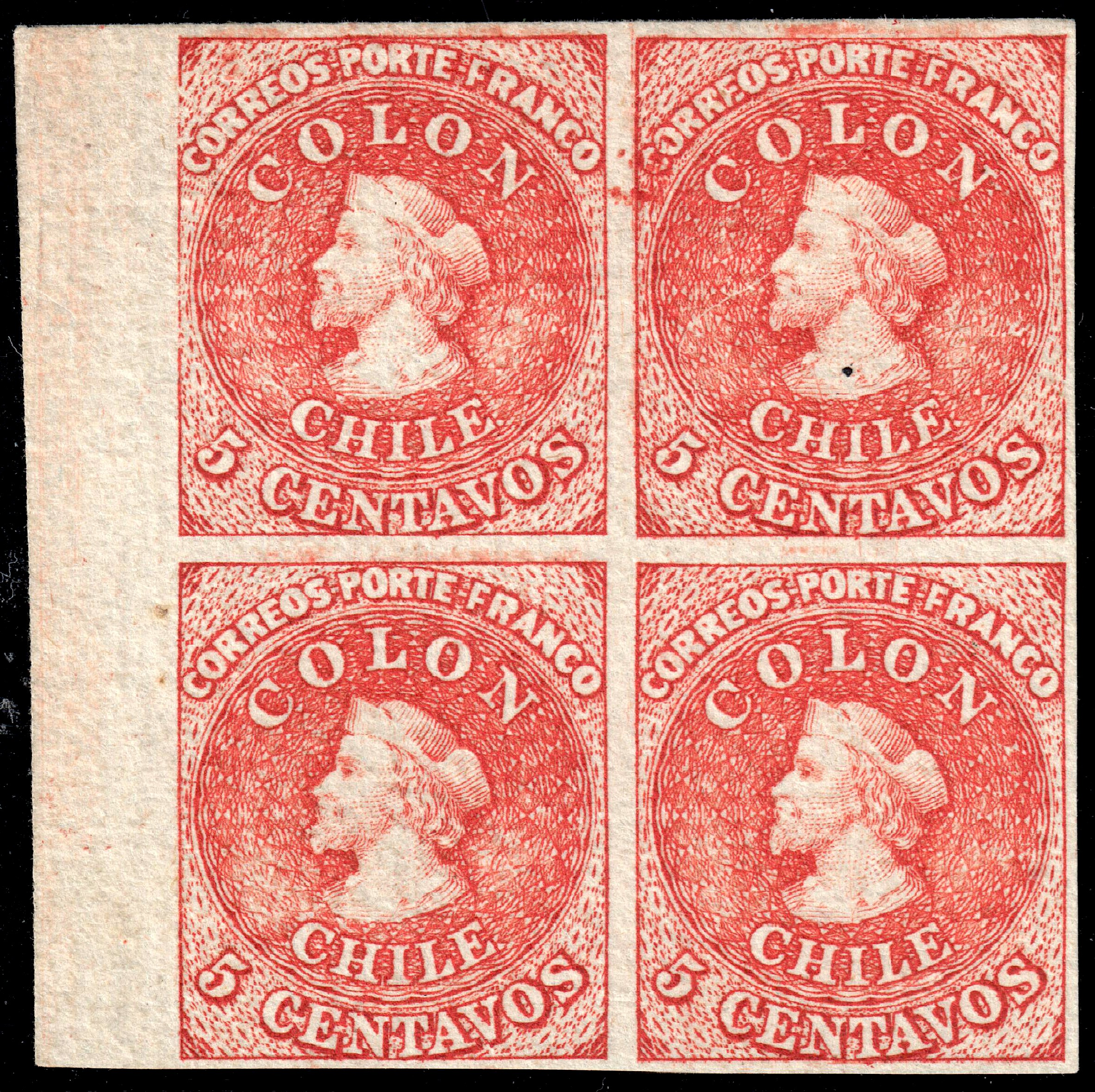
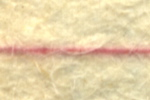
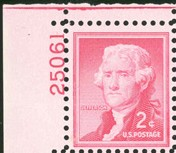
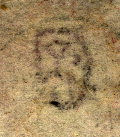
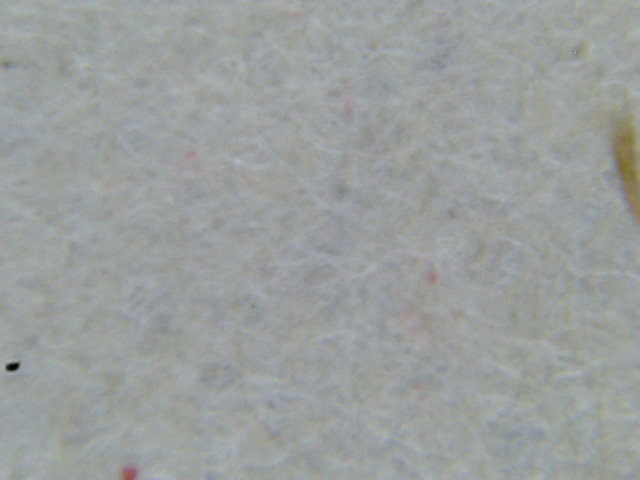
| Paper | Image | Description | Stamp examples |
|---|---|---|---|
| Art | ↔ | Art paper is a very high gloss coated paper similar to magazine paper. As a super fine calendared paper that is coated with china clay to give it an enameled finish, it is useful for printing fine-screen half-tone blocks. | India - Kishangarh SC#37; New Zealand SC#179-181 |
| Batonné | ↔ | Batonné paper describes its texture and is similar to laid paper but has far fewer lines, typically spaced about ½ apart. The spacing of the lines is similar to lined paper, which act as guide lines. Batonné paper may be either wove or laid. When it is formed in laid paper, fine laid lines are visible between the batons. Batonné is from the French meaning baton or staff. | Afghanistan SC#157-161; Fiji SC#6 |
| Bluish | ↔ | The bluish color of this paper is a result of an unintentional chemical reaction of the constituents of the furnish. Another potential cause may be the presence of prussiate of potassium in the ink or latent in the paper. When the paper was dampened prior to printing, the paper fibers were dyed blue. Other terms are the French word blueté or blue rag paper. | U.S. SC#357 - 366; Great Britain SC#8-17 |
| Cardboard | ↔ | Cardboard is a thick white paper that is typically not used for postage stamps. The best examples are the quasi-stamps of Russia, when contrary to regulations, were printed on paper intended for paper currency. U.S. plate proofs are also printed on cardboard. | Russia SC#105-107 |
| Chalky Chalked-surface | ↔ | Chalk paper is a type of safety paper that was designed to cause the stamp's design to rub off or smear when an attempt was made to remove the cancellation on the stamp. The paper was coated with a solution containing a suspension of chalk. The British government used chalky paper in many of its colonies. One destructive test of chalk paper is to rub a piece of silver on the paper. A black, pencil-like mark will result if the paper is chalky. | British Honduras SC# 62-71 (chalky); Mozambique Company SC#4 (chalked-surface) |
| Colored | Great Britain with offices in China, stamps of Hong Kong SC#7 printed on yellow paper | Colored paper can be found in any number of colors. Since color is added to the pulp, the color is present throughout the paper. To identify colored paper, examine both sides of the stamp including the perforated edges. There is tinted paper as well as surface-colored stamps (Great Britain's White Backs as an example), where color was applied intentionally after the normal processes of papermaking were finished. | Afghanistan SC#191-195; Hong Kong SC#89, 94, 96, 102 |
| Double Joined | ↔ | Rotary printing presses require long continuous rolls to keep the presses operational. When one roll was exhausted, another was joined to the end of the first roll to keep the press fed with paper. Where the two lengths of paper were overlapped, a seam was formed creating a double thickness of paper. Normally, these seams were cut from the sheets but occasionally these double paper stamps slipped the inspector's eye and entered into post office stocks. Up until the 1950s, the Scott's catalog listed them with a unique designation. But because double paper stamps became so common, Scott's stopped listing them with a special designation. | U.S. Rotary press issues |
| Double (Security) Duplex | ↔ | Duplex or two-ply paper has two different papers bonded together to form a single finished sheet of paper. The first ply of paper was unsized, therefore very absorbent and would take the cancellation easily. The second ply was sized and much stronger. Charles F Steel patented this double (security) paper to address the U.S. fraud problem in the 1870s. If a person were to attempt to remove the cancellation, the first tissue-like layer of paper, that the stamp's design was printed, would rub off, thereby destroying the stamp. | U.S. SC#156 |
| Enameled | ↔ | This paper is similar to chalky paper but appears slightly grayish. When held up to a light, rather than a uniform appearance, enameled paper is distinctly mottled. | Angola SC#26; Mozambique Company SC# 4, 6-9 |
| Goldbeater's skin | ↔ | Goldbeater's skin is not paper, but rather a very thin membrane derived from animal intestines. It was made transparent with resin or collodium. The stamp's design was printed in reverse on the back of the membrane and the adhesive was applied over the design. When the stamp was applied to the letter, the stamp's design appeared through the membrane correctly. | Prussia SC #21-22 |
| Glazed | Glazed paper with a glossy finish | Glazed paper is given a glossy finish by glazing with friction of applied heat versus a glossy finish created by a coating. It is synonymous with surfaced-paper. | El Salvador SC#336-348; India SC#9-10 (Blue glazed paper) |
| Granite | Granite Paper of Switzerland SC#65 magnified 35x | Granite paper has colored (typically red and/or blue) silk fibers added to the furnish. Another name for granite paper was silurian paper as it only contained blue fibers and the paper was bluish-gray. | Switzerland SC#60-68; U.S. SC#1252, 1326 |
| Native | ↔ | Native paper describes the paper local to the region the stamps were originally printed on. The composition of the furnish was of local materials. European paper typically replaced native papers. | Japan SC#; Nepal SC#7; Tibet SC#1 |
| Laid | Vertical laid paper (light and dark lines can be seen in the bottom border) | When laid paper is held up to a light, its texture can be seen as light and dark lines. The lines are not a result of the printing but are a result of the paper making process. When the stamp's design is printed on laid paper, the lines can be either vertical or horizontal. | Bulgaria SC#1-27 Horizontal; Russia SC#55-71 Vertical |
| Oblong quadrille | ↔ | The texture of oblong quadrille results from wires on the paper mould that form a rectangular pattern. This texture is similar to quadrille and laid as it is formed in the same manner. | Mexico - Guadalajara SC# 38-41; Colombia - Tolima SC# 74-75 |
| Palimpsest | Printed on blue-lined paper | The term palimpsest actually is defined as parchment or velum that has been reused to the extent that the previous writing can still be faintly seen. Philatelically, paper that was originally designed to be used for another purpose and then used for printing of stamps is also categorized as palimpsest. The most famous are from Latvia, when after World War I, the Latvian government printed stamps on the back of German military maps. Later, Latvia printed stamps on the backs of unfinished banknotes of the Bolshevists and the government of Colonel Bermondt-Avalov. | Latvia SC#1 and 68-69; Mexico SC#195-211 |
| Pelure | Pelure paper's transparency demonstrated by placing over the words PELURE; Russian Soviet Federated Socialist Republic 1924 100r | Thin, often brittle, semi-transparent paper and can be either woven or laid and is rendered semi-transparent by the resins used in the manufacturing of the paper. Stamps printed on pelure paper sometimes do not survive wholly intact because of their brittle nature. Pelure is easily identified because of its transparency. Pelure is a French word meaning skin or peel, like that of a banana, which is why sometimes this paper is compared to onionskin paper. | Latvia SC#9-56; Colombia SC#303-313; Russia SC#181a |
| Phosphored-coated | ↔ | Luminescence is a characteristic of the mineral zinc orthosilicate, which glows a yellowish-green when illuminated with shortwave ultraviolet light. The U.S first issue that used phosphor-coated paper was the Flag over Yosemite definitive coil in 1989. | U.S. SC#2280 |
| Quadrille | Front and back of France's 1892 15c quadrille printed paper | Quadrille describes the texture of this paper, where the laid lines form small squares about 1/8 of an inch. This texture is similar to laid and oblong quadrille because they are formed by the mould in the same manner. There have been instances when the quadrille pattern was lightly printed onto the paper after it was made. | Fiji SC#1-5 (paper); France SC#103 (printed) |
| Ribbed Repp | Chile 1870 5c reprint on ribbed paper | Ribbed paper or Repp paper describes the texture created by paper-making rollers that have fine corrugations cut into them. Ribbed paper can be confused with paper with heavy laid lines as their appearance when held to a light is similar. One way to determine if the paper is ribbed is to run your finger over the surface of the stamp, since ribbing is not a watermark but a texturing of the surface of the stamp. | Afghanistan SC#146-153; Poland SC#81-92 |
| Safety or Security | See Security paper gallery below | This is the large group of paper that describes the many varieties of paper used to prevent the reuse of a postage stamp. Included in this group are: Double paper, e.g. invented by C F Steel; Paper with colored dots; Chalk paper; Burelage or network paper; Bank check paper | Venezuela SC#293-304 (Bank check paper); El Salvador SC#414-421 (Paper with colored dots); Danzig SC#117-125 (Network paper); Denmark SC#1-2 (Burelage); Ceylon SC#207-218 (Chalky) |
| Silk | ↔ | When short uncolored silk fibers are added to the furnish, the paper is designated as silk paper. Silk paper is often confused with silk-thread paper (next entry). Silk paper was used for some U.S. revenue stamps. |
| Silk thread | Closeup of the red thread embedded in the paper of Switzerland's 1855 10 Rappen stamp | John Dickinson patented silk-thread paper in 1830 for bank notes and later adapted the technology for stamps. Dickinson paper is the trade name for this paper and was used by Switzerland and Bavaria. Passing paper is a particular type silk thread paper that was manufactured in Pasing, Bavaria and used in Bavaria's stamps between 1849 and 1868. | Bavaria SC#2-14; Great Britain SC#5-7; Switzerland SC#14-31 |
| Silkote | Silkote paper | Silkote is the trade name given to the paper that had optical brighteners added to the furnish. It was an experimental issue that was tested in the Westbrook substation in Maine, U.S. during the Christmas of 1954. | U.S. SC#1033a |
| Tagged | ↔ | A paper to which a luminescent additive was added to the furnish to facilitate the automation of the facing and canceling operation. Also paper with a luminescent coating. | U.S. SC#2115b (paper with additive); Deutsche Bundespost since 1961 (fluorescent coating) |
| Toned | ↔ | Paper that is off-white or with a brownish or buffish tinge is called toned paper. | Cook Islands SC#1-4; Romania SC#166-172 |
| Watermarked | Elephant head watermark used on early stamps of India | A watermark is created in the paper by the mould or the Dandy roll and can be letters or designs. | India SC#19-25; U.S. SC#264-278 |
| Wove | Wove paper as magnified from the back of the US 1890-923 2c. Notice the left to right direction of the fibers. | The texture of wove paper has no discernible pattern when the paper is held up to a light. The paper is formed on a mould, unlike laid paper, that does not have wires attached to it and so the pulp forms an even web of fibers. | Brazil SC#99-108 |

=== Security paper gallery ===
Examples of different security paper used on postage stamps.

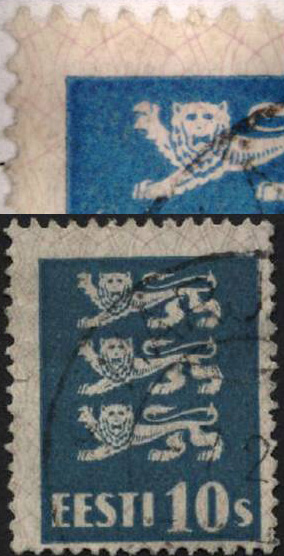
Lilac network of Estonia's 1928–35 10s stamp

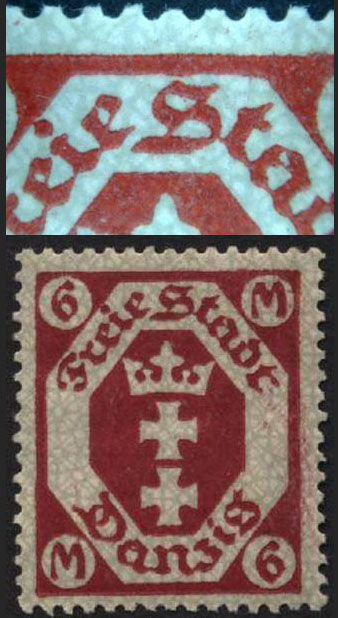
Gray network of Danzig's 1922 6m stamp

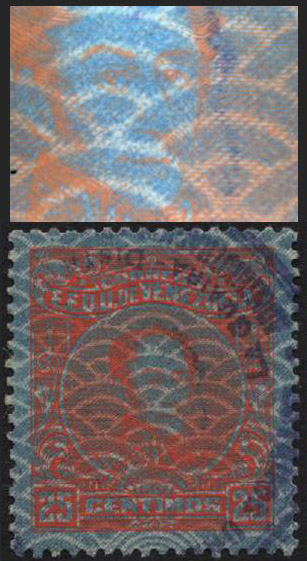
Blue Winchester security paper of Venezuela's 1932–38 25c stamp

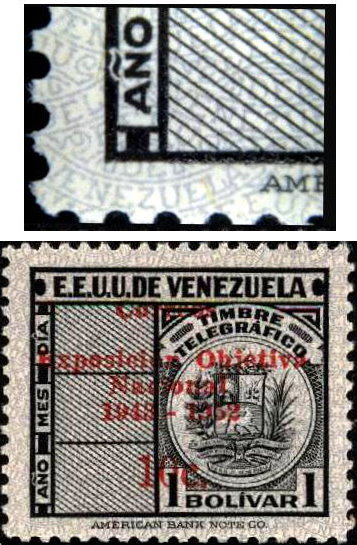
Security paper of Venezuela's 1952 1b security stamp

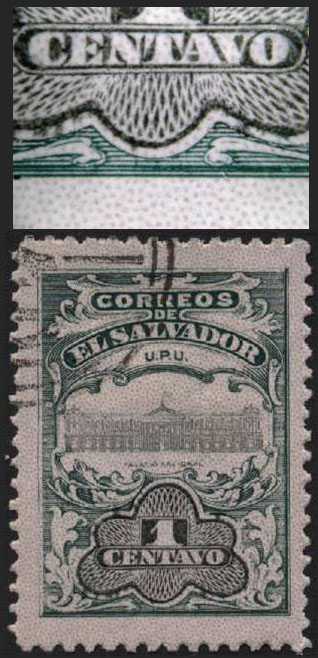
Colored dots on El Salvador's 1907 1c stamp

== Notes and references ==
=== Books ===
- Standard Catalog of U.S. Stamps, 2003, 6th Edition Krause - Minkus ISBN 0-87349-473-3
- Stephen R Datz, Official Stamp Collector's Bible 2003 ISBN 0-609-80884-2
- Rodney A Juell and Steven J Rod, Encyclopedia of United States Stamps and Stamp Collecting 2006 ISBN 1-886513-98-8
- Josep Asunción, The Complete Book of Papermaking (Lark Books, 2001) ISBN 1-57990-456-4
- Arnold Grummer, Complete Guide to Easy Papermaking (Krause Publications, 1999) ISBN 0-87341-710-0

=== Websites ===
- How a Postage Stamp is Made
- Calvet M Hahn, The Topic is Paper 2002
