= Killer (philately) =

Type of cancellation of postage stamps

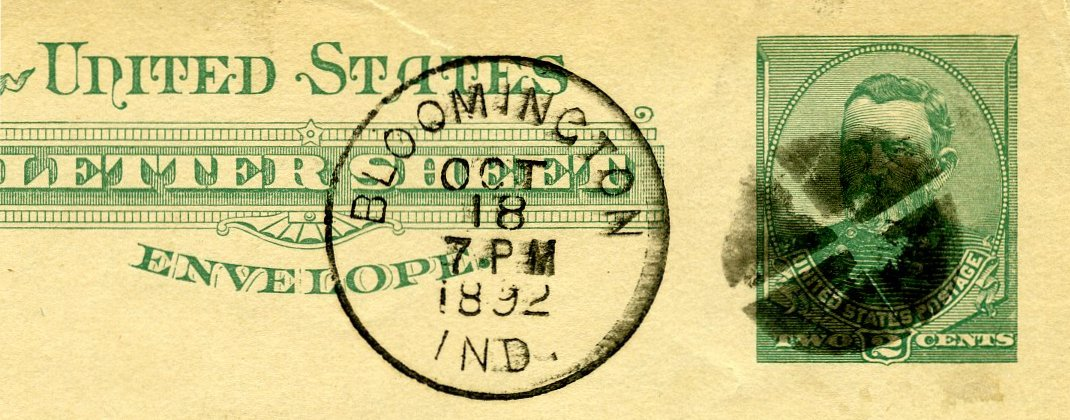
Cork killer (right) obliterating indicia on 1886 Grant letter sheet, with 1892 postmark

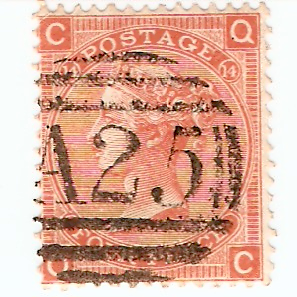
Numeral killer cancellation on 1865 British stamp used in Malta

In philately, a killer is a particularly heavy type of handstamp, or portion of one, consisting of heavy bars, cork impressions or other crude devices used to cancel postage stamps. Such handstamps may also be known as obliterators, as the mark applied often obscures almost the whole of the stamp.

Killers were often used in the early days of stamps as the postal authorities wished to ensure that stamps could not be re-used. When used for this purpose, the marking is also known as cancellation, or cancel. There is no exact definition of what is and is not a killer cancel, and the term can be used to apply to any heavy cancellation.

In the United States, this is also the name for a particular circular date stamp with four thick horizontal bars to the right. This handstamp effectively cancels the stamp while leaving the place and date information easily visible. The bars are known as killer bars.

== See also ==
- Cancellation (mail)
- Postmark
