= Tagging (stamp) =

Printing on luminescent paper or with luminescent ink

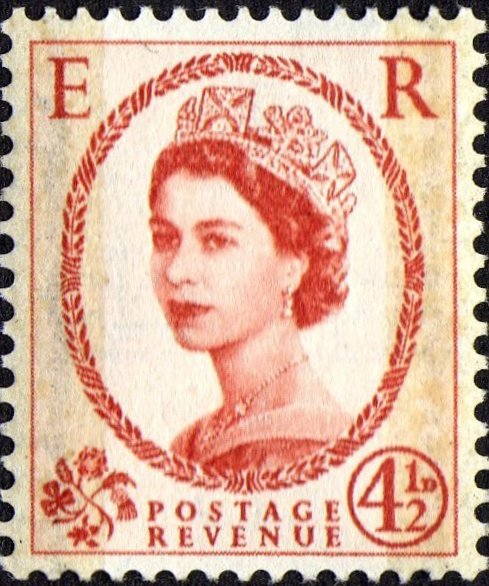
1959 tagged 4 1/2 pence Wilding stamp clearly showing two vertical bands on both sides

Tagging of postage stamps means that the stamps are printed on luminescent paper or with luminescent ink to facilitate automated mail processing. Both fluorescence and phosphorescence are used. The same stamp may have been printed with and without these luminescent features. The two varieties are referred to as tagged and untagged, respectively.

== Technology ==
Letters and postcards fed into an automated mail processing plant are illuminated with ultraviolet light. The reaction of the luminescent features of the stamps on this illumination is used to position the mail items such that the stamps can be cancelled, and that the significant parts of the address such as postcodes may be read and the mail be sorted accordingly.

The luminescent features of the stamps are generally invisible or barely visible to the human eye in normal illumination. However, they can be identified under ultraviolet light similar to how it is done in the postal machinery. In general, fluorescent features can be identified with UV light of a longer wavelength than needed for phosphorescent features (see below).

The luminescent substance ("taggant") can be printed over the whole surface of the stamp, the main design, the margins only, single bands or bars or other patterns, or can be added to the paper itself.

The tagging pattern can also be varied to enable the sorting of mail according to the service class.

== Methods and detection ==
=== Fluorescence ===
Upon absorption of light, fluorescent materials emit light upon of a longer wavelength (lower energy) than the absorbed radiation, but cease to do so once immediately, when the illumination is stopped. The tagging of stamps uses substances that absorb ultraviolet light of wavelengths between 300 nm and 450 nm ("Black light", UVA, long-wave UV) and emit light in the visible spectrum. Under UV illumination they usually glow a greenish or yellowish colour.

It must not be confused with the "whitening" of paper. It is achieved by adding optical brighteners that usually re-emit light in the blue region of the spectrum, making the paper appear whiter by compensating a perceived deficit in reflected colours of these wavelengths.

=== Phosphorescence ===
Phosphorescent materials release the absorbed energy only slowly, so that they exhibit an "afterglow". Materials for stamp tagging absorb ultraviolet light of wavelengths between 180 nm and 300 nm (UVC, short-wave UV) and emit light of a greenish or reddish colour depending on the substances used.

=== Detection equipment ===
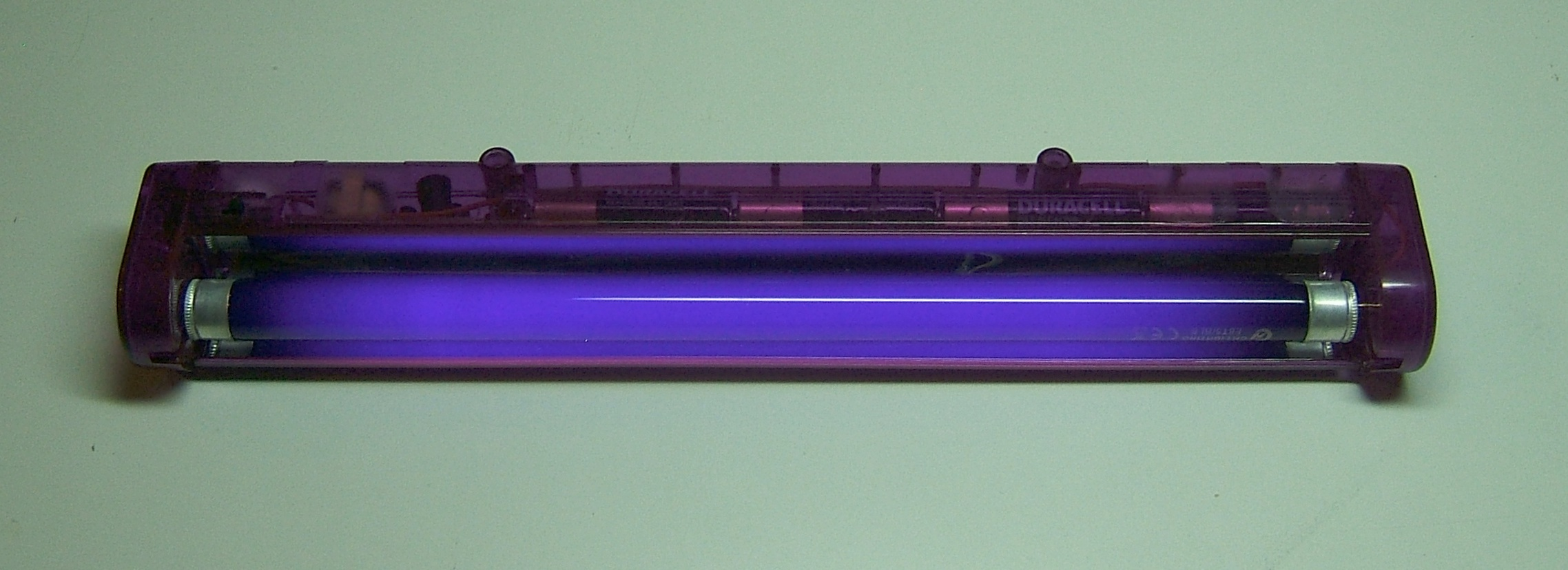
Black light fluorescent lamp

Fluorescent stamps can be detected with a black light fluorescent tube. Phosphorescent stamps can be detected using a shortwave UV lamp. The effects of both processes can be recorded photographically. Lamps for both ranges of wavelengths as well as combinations of both are available. Care must be taken when using UV lamps, since their light can damage the eyes.

== Application in various countries ==
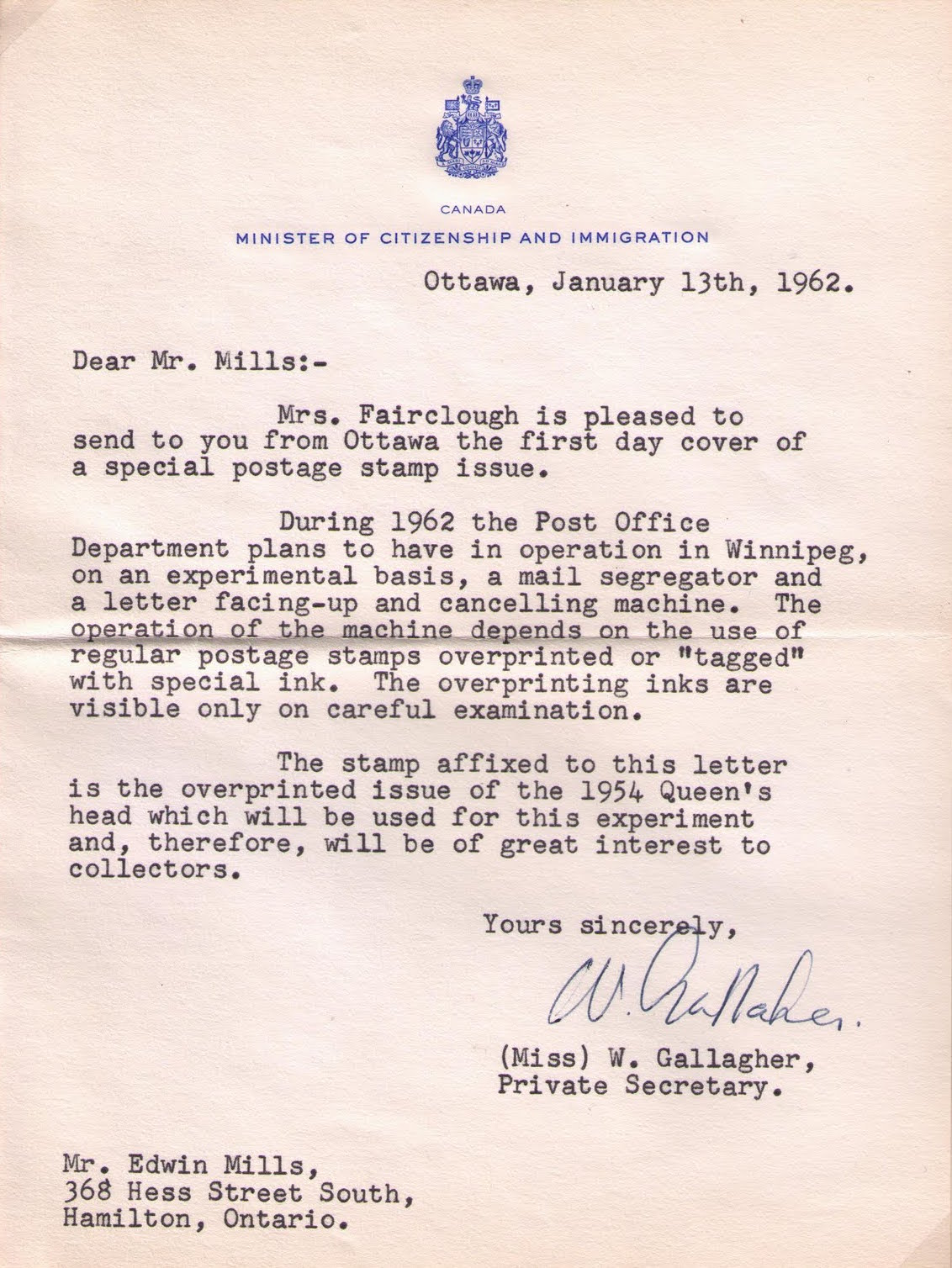
Official letter concerning the introduction of the first tagged Canadian stamps

=== Canada ===
The first tagged stamps of Canada were issued in 1962 with vertical phosphorescent bands. In 1972, fluorescent general tagging was introduced, initially as vertical bars, now normally on all four sides of the stamp.

=== Germany ===
Deutsche Bundespost started issuing stamps on fluorescent Lumogen paper in 1960 in connection with trials for automated mail processing in the Darmstadt area. Fluorescent paper was generally used for stamps of Deutsche Bundespost and Deutsche Bundespost Berlin from 1961 on. Deutsche Post AG continues to use this technology. Deutsche Post of the GDR did not use luminescent tagging on stamps.

=== United Kingdom ===
Luminescent tagging has been added to postage stamps of the United Kingdom since the Wilding issues of 1959 in the shape of vertical bands. Stamps of the current Machin series have been printed with one or two such "phosphor bands"; those for second-class mail bear only one such band, those for first-class mail bear two. The positions of the bands may vary: stamps from booklets may have shortened, notched, or inset bands that do not extend onto neighbouring gutters to avoid the use of the latter instead of stamps for franking. Due to the presence of optical brighteners in many printing papers, phosphorescent materials were chosen for stamp tagging in the UK.

=== United States ===
The US Post Office Department started experiments with fluorescent compounds in the early 1960s. Raytech Industries, Inc. Stafford Springs, Conn. was behind the technical development An 8¢ air mail stamp issued in 1963 was the first stamp printed for trials with new cancelling machines. The 5¢ City Delivery issue of 1963 was the first commemorative issue produced with tagging.

Precancelled stamps and service-inscribed stamps are not usually tagged because they need not be routed through the cancelling equipment.

== Other uses ==
Since luminescent ink or luminescent paper are only delivered to specialist printers, tagging also serves as an anti-counterfeiting measure, similar to the practice on banknotes.

== Alternatives ==
When Deutsche Post of the GDR expanded automated mail processing in the 1980s, they did not use luminescent tagging, but used sideways illumination to identify the shadows of the stamp perforation in order to position mail items in cancelling and sorting machinery. Red light was used for this purpose, giving a good contrast to ordinary writing ink colours and enabling machine reading of postcodes. Some issues of Postal cards were printed entirely in orange to facilitate the latter process. However, the colours of the imprinted stamps was later changed to those of the usual definitives of the corresponding value, and simulated perforations were added around the stamp design to help locate the stamp position.
