= Postage stamp reuse =

Technique of fraudulently reusing postage stamps

Postage stamp reuse is the technique of fraudulently reusing postage stamps from sent mail to avoid paying the cost of postage.

== Reuse ==
A postage stamp is a small piece of paper attached to mail that indicates that the postage (the cost of sending the mail) has been paid. Because stamps are sent on most mail, the stamp on a received item can be removed and placed on a different piece of mail to be sent, thus reusing the stamp without paying the proper postage.

In many countries, such as the United States, reuse of used stamps, whether cancelled or not, is illegal.

== Prevention ==
=== Mute cancellation (killer) ===
After use, many stamps are marked with a cancellation by the postal system, which defaces the stamp and prevents its reuse. The cancellation usually includes a killer placed on the stamp that has black bars, cork impressions or other obstructive shapes to deface the stamp. Instead of using an entirely separate mark, some countries use their postmark, placed on the stamp, to cancel mail. The process has largely become the domain of postal sorting machines, such as the Advanced Facer-Canceller System (AFCS) which began to see use within the United States in 2010. Modern machines are able to apply cancellation while performing other tasks related to the sorting and handling of mail through the use of stamps with phosphorescent ink.

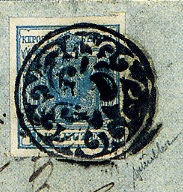
Rare mute cancellation in the Austrian empire 1850 issue

=== Grilling ===
In the United States, the experiment of grilling was tried in 1867, where tiny squares were embossed into the paper after the stamp was printed, the idea being that this would break up the paper fibers and let more ink be absorbed into the paper. Grilling was abandoned around 1871 due to the stamps being more likely to tear. Unusual types of grills are typically found on rare U.S. stamps.

=== Design with water-soluble inks ===
In the 1880s in Great Britain, the use of inks which were water-soluble, thus preventing successful washing, was used. Only lilac and green colors were available. This scheme was abandoned after a few years, and the few surviving unwashed stamps have become collectibles.

=== Surface coating ===
Later experiments involved surface coatings. Between 1901 and 1907 Austria applied varnish bars, thin diagonal strips of varnish, to the paper before printing the design. Russia did the same between 1909 and 1915, applying the varnish in a pattern of lozenges. In both cases the theory was the same; the ink of the printed design would not soak into the varnish, so that in the washing process the design would tend to flake off, forming a telltale pattern on the washed stamp. The United States also coated a few of their $1 revenue stamps with varnish around the turn of the 20th century.

=== Perfin ===
A perfin is a stamp that has had initials or a name perforated across it to discourage theft. By agreement with postal authorities, a perfin stamp on a letter could be used only by the owner of the perfin. Therefore, a stolen perforated stamp would be of no value to the unauthorized bearer.

=== Varia ===
More unusual methods have included tearing or slicing the stamp, but this is a slower process and can easily damage the contents, and was only occasionally used. An example is 19th century Afghanistan, where cancellation involved the removal of part of the stamp rather than applying ink or other surface marking.

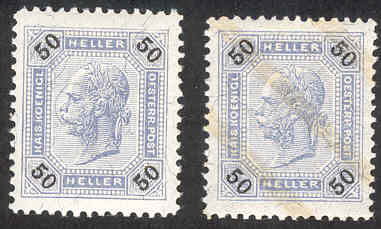
50 heller 1901 unused stamps of Austria, normal and with varnish bars

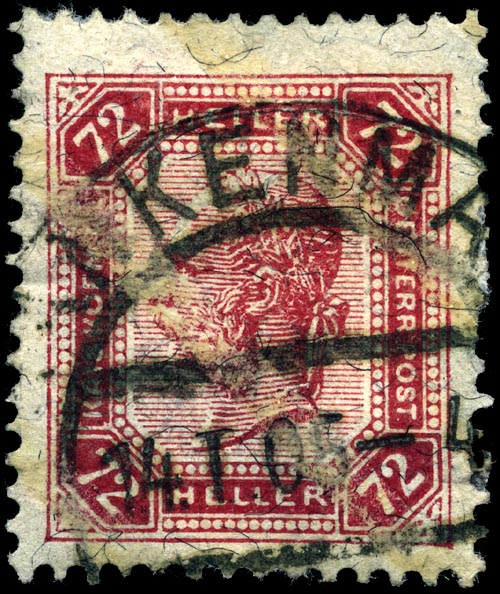
1904 stamp of Austria, showing varnish bars after washing
