= Plate number =

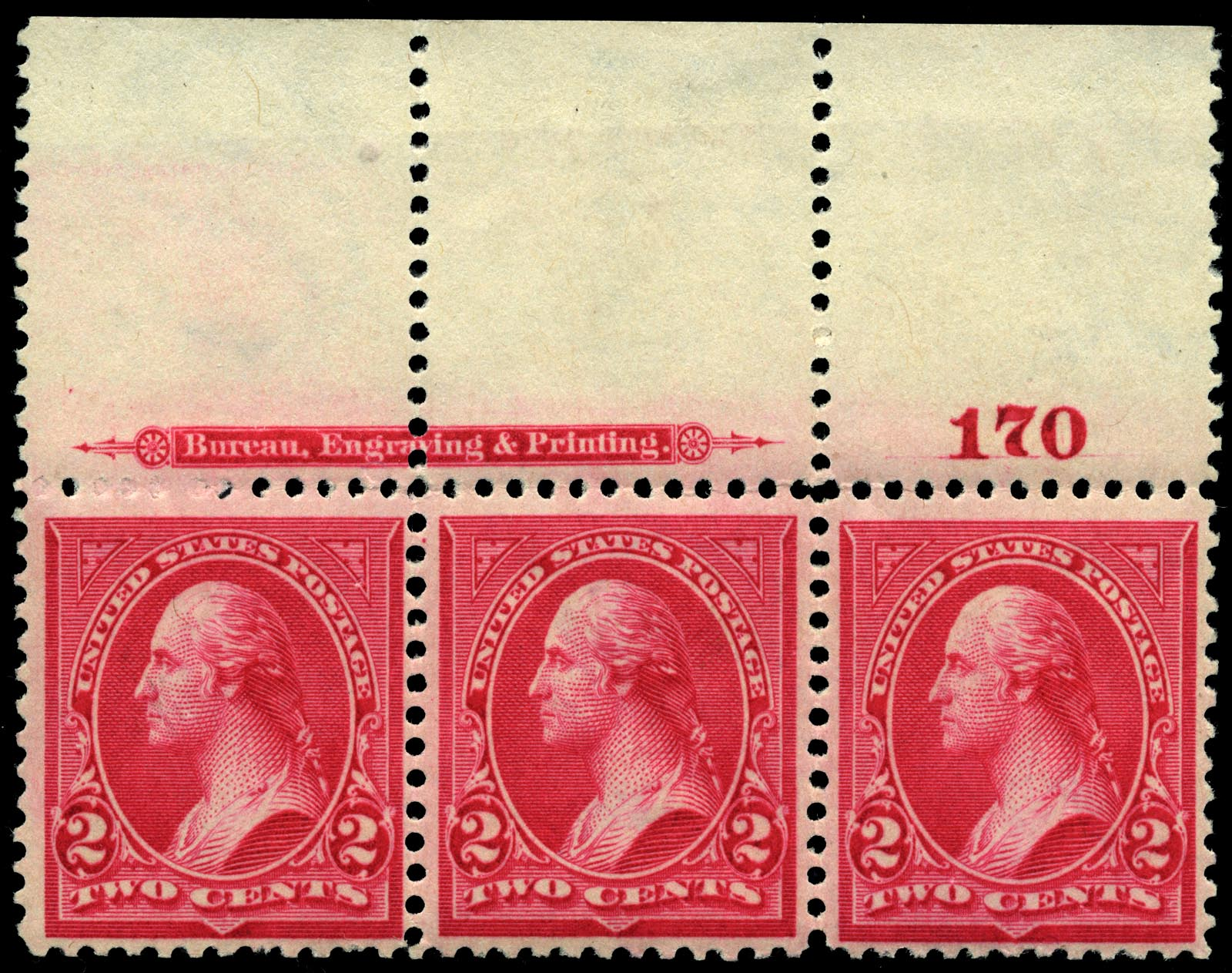
This strip from a sheet of US stamps from 1895 shows they were printed with plate number 170.

A plate number is a number printed in the margin of a sheet or roll of postage stamps, or on the stamp itself, which shows the printing plate used to print the stamps.

A plate number is the serial number of a printing plate. It is printed in the selvage or border of a pane of postage stamps.

Philatelists and stamp collectors analyze or collect plate numbers and stamps with different plate numbers, often as a block, thereby known as a plate block. The American Plate Number Single Society (APNSS) is an example of a specialist philatelic society which focuses on single stamps with plate numbers. APNSS is affiliate #178 of the American Philatelic Society

A plate number coil (PNC) is a United States postage stamp with the number of the printing plate or plates printed on it. The plate number typically appears as one or more small digits in the margin at the bottom of the stamp. The plate number may be centered or, on some coil issues, located toward the right. Although most plate numbers are composed of just numbers, both a combination of letter and number may be used. In the case when a letter is represented in the plate number, an upper case letter usually appears at the beginning or at the end of the sequence with the former serving as a good identifier of the stamp printer.

The plate number is on one stamp out of the number of stamps printed by a single revolution of rotary printing press used to print the stamps.

In the example above, which is a closeup of a strip of 1996 "flag over porch" self-adhesive stamps, we can see a plate number comprising five digits, one for each color layer. The digits are quite small, and often hard to read because they are blurred by the halftone screen. Also, in this example, the numbers on the left, known as micro-printing, usually denote the year the issue is copyrighted or printed and, therefore, should not be mistaken as the plate number. While there are other factors such as condition and centering, the philatelic value of a PNC single or strip highly depends on its plate numbers with some plate numbers commanding higher catalog values due to their rarity and strong collector interest.

Collectors specializing in PNC collecting typically save plate number coils in the following formats:

1. PNC5 – Plate Number Coil 5 – A strip of 5 mint stamps with the plate number coil on the center stamp.
2. PNC3 – Plate Number Coil 3 – A strip of 3 mint stamps with the plate number coil on the center stamp. Although many collectors still collect coils in this format, a larger number of these collectors prefers the PNC5 format. As a result, a PNC3 is less desirable than a PNC5 as evidenced by many specialized stamp catalogs now assigning much higher premiums to PNC5 formats of earlier coil issues. Initially, saving PNC3s had been the practice adopted by many collectors and dealers alike and, therefore, not many early issues were saved in the longer format.
3. PNS – Plate Number Single – A single unused or used plate number coil stamp. If used, the plate number must be identifiable and not be obliterated by the postmark, although many precanceled issues, in order to show their proper use and to be collectible, should not receive any postmarks.
4. On cover – An envelope bearing a used plate number coil stamp with a contemporary postmark tying the stamp to the envelope. Many collectors prefer the cover to have the correct postage and proper stamp or stamps used for the envelope. An example of an improper use is to combine many precanceled stamps and older issues on an envelope as payment for a first class postage. Although this practice is allowed by the Post Office, most collectors find this and stamp collector contrived or philatelic covers less desirable.

Some coil issues will require collectors to save longer than even the PNC5 mentioned earlier. For example, the United States Crops coil stamps, issued in 2006, have five designs with only one of the stamp designs bearing a plate number. While some collectors will save this issue as a PNC5 and no shorter, others may choose to save it as a PNC11 so that the stamps of the same design with and without the plate number are represented.

== External links and further reading ==
- Glossary of stamp collecting terms specific to plate number single collecting
- Illustrated examples of every extant United States postage stamp issued with plate numbers
