= List of United States airmail stamps =

Domestic U.S. Air Mail was established as a new class of mail service by the United States Post Office Department (POD) on May 15, 1918, with the inauguration of the Washington–Philadelphia–New York route. Special postage stamps were issued for use with this service. Domestic air mail became obsolete in 1975, and international air mail in 1995, when the USPS began transporting First Class mail by air on a routine basis. All post-1977 United States stamp images are copyright of USPS.

Scott cataloged stamps received a "C" designation for airmail issues beginning in 1940. Designated for international mail, and showing a small airplane, the January, 2012 $1.05 Scenic America series issue was designated C150. However, with the January, 2013 issue of the $1.10 Global Forever Stamp no specific airmail purpose was shown in the design. Rather, the Postal Service stated that this "stamp offers a single price for any First-Class Mail International 1-ounce letter to any country in the world." Thus a regular series Scott number, 4740, was designated.

== 1918–1919 ==
Date Issued	Type	Subject	Plate No.	Image	No. Issued
May 13, 1918	24¢ Rose & Blue; Size: ^{7}/_{8} x ^{3}/_{4} inch	Inverted Curtis Jenny Biplane; Design: Claire Aubrey Huston; Engravers: J. Eissler and Edward M. Hall	8493 T, 8493 B	see also	~100 (1 plate) Error
May 13, 1918	24¢ Rose & Blue; Size: ^{7}/_{8} x ^{3}/_{4} inch	Curtis Jenny Biplane; Design: Claire Aubrey Huston; Engravers: J. Eissler and Edward M. Hall	8492 T, 8493 T		3,095,955
July 11, 1918	16¢ Green; Size: ^{7}/_{8} x ^{3}/_{4} inch	Curtis Jenny Biplane; Design: Claire Aubrey Huston; Engravers: J. Eissler and Edward M. Hall	F8900 T		3,793,987
December 10, 1918	6¢ Orange; Size: ^{7}/_{8} x ^{3}/_{4} inch	Curtis Jenny Biplane; Design: Claire Aubrey Huston; Engravers: J. Eissler and Edward M. Hall	1955 T, Unused plate: 9164		2,134,988

== 1920–1929 ==
Date Issued	Type	Subject	Plate No.	Image	No. Issued
August 15, 1923	8¢ Dark Green; Size: ^{7}/_{8} x ^{3}/_{4} inch	De Havilland Airplane Propeller and Radiator; Design: C. A. Huston; Engraved: H. Dawson and E. M. Weeks	14824–14827 L (four plates)		6,414,576
August 17, 1923	16¢ Dark Blue; Size: ^{7}/_{8} x ^{3}/_{4} inch	U.S. Air Mail Service Insignia; Design: C. A. Huston; Engraved: H. Dawson and E. M. Hall	14828-14831 L (four plates)		5,309,275
August 21, 1923	24¢ Carmine Rose; Size: ^{7}/_{8} x ^{3}/_{4} inch	De Havilland DH-4 Biplane; Design: C. A. Huston; Engraved: J. Eissler and E. M. Hall	14840–14843 L (four plates)		5,285,775
February 13, 1926	10¢ Dark Blue; Size: 1^{84}/_{100} x ^{75}/_{100} inch	Map of the U.S. & two planes Design: C. A. Huston	18246 R, 18247 B		more than 42,092,800
September 18, 1926	15¢ Olive Brown; Size: 1^{84}/_{100} x ^{75}/_{100} inch	Map of the U.S. & two planes Design: C. A. Huston	18746 L		15,597,307
January 25, 1927	20¢ Yellow Green; Size: 1^{84}/_{100} x ^{75}/_{100} inch	Map of the U.S. & two planes Design: C. A. Huston	18898 R, F18892 B		17,616,350
June 18, 1927	10¢ Dark Blue; Size: 1^{84}/_{100} x ^{75}/_{100} inch	Spirit of St. Louis	18999 R, 19427		20,379,179
July 25, 1928	5¢ Carmine & Blue; Size: 1^{15}/_{32} x 1^{3}/_{32} inch	Beacon on Sherman Hill; Design: A.R. Meissner	19570 T, 19701 T (red); 19546 T (blue)		106,887,675

== 1930–1939 ==
Date Issued	Type	Subject	Plate No.	Image	No. Issued
February 10, 1930	5¢ Violet (Note: Flat Plate Printing – A printing process in which stamps are printed from a flat plate pressed straight down onto the blank sheet. The gum on the back of a Flat Plate stamp will be smooth.); Size: 1^{84}/_{100} x ^{75}/_{100} inch	Winged Globe; Design: Alvin R. Meissner	19944 L		97,641,200
April 19, 1930	65¢ Green; Size: 1^{84}/_{100} x ^{75}/_{100} inch	Graf Zeppelin over the Atlantic	20077 L		93,536 sold
April 19, 1930	$1.30 Brown; Size: 1^{84}/_{100} x ^{75}/_{100} inch	Graf Zeppelin over the Atlantic	20085 B		72,428 sold
April 19, 1930	$2.60 Blue; Size: 1^{84}/_{100} x ^{75}/_{100} inch	Graf Zeppelin; See also: 1930 Graf Zeppelin stamps	20092 R		61,296 sold
August 19, 1931	5¢ Violet (Note: Rotary Press Printing – A printing process in which stamps are printed from a round plates that roll over the blank sheets. The design will be slightly larger than flat plate stamps due to stretching during the printing process. The gum on the back of a Rotary Press stamp will have ridges.); Size: 1^{84}/_{100} x ^{75}/_{100} inch	Winged Globe; Design: Alvin R. Meissner	20606 LL		57,340,050
September 26, 1932	8¢ Olive Bistre; Size: 1^{84}/_{100} x ^{75}/_{100} inch	Winged Globe; Design: Alvin R. Meissner	21030 UR		76,648,803
October 2, 1933	50¢ Green (Note: Perf 11); Size: 1^{84}/_{100} x ^{75}/_{100} inch	Graf Zeppelin	21172 B		324,070
June 30, 1934	6¢ Dull Orange; Size: 1^{84}/_{100} x ^{75}/_{100} inch	Winged Globe; Design: Alvin R. Meissner	22135 UL		302,205,100
August 30, 1934	16¢ Dark Blue	Great Seal of the U.S. (Air Mail Special Delivery)	_{21313, 21313 F} – Reprinted imperforate, 1935		9,215,750
November 22, 1935	25¢ Blue	China Clipper; Design: Alvin R. Meissner	_{21473}		10,205,400
February 10, 1936	16¢ Carmine & Blue	Great Seal of the U.S. (Air Mail Special Delivery)	_{21497 F, 21495 F, 21493}		72,517,850
February 15, 1937	20¢ Green	China Clipper; Design: Alvin R. Meissner	_{21622}		12,794,600
February 15, 1937	50¢ Carmine	China Clipper; Design: Alvin R. Meissner	_{21624}		9,285,300
May 14, 1938	6¢ Carmine & Blue	Eagle and Shield			349,946,500
May 16, 1939	30¢ Blue; Size: 1^{84}/_{100} x ^{75}/_{100} inch	Winged Globe; Design: Alvin R. Meissner	_{F22384 T, 22381}		19,768,150

== 1940–1949 ==
Date Issued	Type	Subject	Plate No.	Image	No. Issued
June 25, 1941	6¢ Carmine (Note: Perf 11 x 10½) (200 Subject Electric Eye Plates); Size: 1.44 x 0.84 inch	The Twin-Motored Transport Plane	Following are shared among the 1941 issues: 40 plates between 22752-23349 & 22756-9 (4 plates)		4,746,527,700
March 21, 1944	8¢ Olive Green (200 Subject Electric Eye Plates); Size: 1.44 x 0.84 inch	The Twin-Motored Transport Plane	23126		1,744,878,650
August 15, 1941	10¢ Violet (200 Subject Electric Eye Plates); Size: 1.44 x 0.84 inch	The Twin-Motored Transport Plane			67,117,400
August 10, 1941	15¢ Brown (200 Subject Electric Eye Plates); Size: 1.44 x 0.84 inch	The Twin-Motored Transport Plane			78,434,800
August 27, 1941	20¢ Green (200 Subject Electric Eye Plates); Size: 1.44 x 0.84 inch	The Twin-Motored Transport Plane			42,359,850
September 25, 1941	30¢ Blue (200 Subject Electric Eye Plates); Size: 1.44 x 0.84 inch	The Twin-Motored Transport Plane			59,880,850
October 29, 1941	50¢ Orange (200 Subject Electric Eye Plates)	The Twin-Motored Transport Plane	22779		11,160,600
September 26, 1946	5¢ Carmine; Size: 1.44 x 0.84 inch	DC-4 Skymaster	22778, 22779		72,517,850
March 26, 1947	5¢ Carmine (Note: wet technique, from 15 to 35% moisture content, less sharp) (400 Subject Electric Eye Plates); Size: 1.44 x 0.84 inch	DC-4 Skymaster	23486, 23588, 23973, 25422		971,903,700
August 30, 1947	10¢ Black (200 Subject Electric Eye Plates); Size: 1.44 x 0.84 inch	Martin 2-0-2 over Pan American Union Building, Wash. D.C.	(Note: dry technique, from 5 to 10% moisture content, more sharp); 23694		207,976,550
August 20, 1947	15¢ Green (200 Subject Electric Eye Plates); Size: 1.44 x 0.84 inch	Lockheed Constellation over New York Skyline	23683		756,186,350
July 30, 1947	25¢ Blue (200 Subject Electric Eye Plates); Size: 1.44 x 0.84 inch	Stratocruiser over the San Francisco Oakland Bay Bridge	25615		132,956,100
January 15, 1948	5¢ Carmine (Note: Coil stamp – a type of postage stamp sold in strips one stamp wide)	DC-4 Skymaster			33,244,500
July 31, 1948	5¢ Red	New York City	23846, 23851		38,449,100
January 18, 1949	6¢ Carmine	DC-4 Skymaster			5,070,095,200
May 11, 1948	6¢ Carmine	Alexandria Bicentennial	24085		75,085,000
August 25, 1949	6¢ Carmine	DC-4 Skymaster			260,307,500
November 18, 1949	10¢ Violet	U.P.U. P.O. Building			21,061,300
October 7, 1949	15¢ Ultramarine	U.P.U. Globe and Doves			36,613,100
November 30, 1949	25¢ Rose	U.P.U. Boeing Stratocruiser			16,217,100
December 17, 1949	6¢ Magenta	Wright Brothers	24158		80,405,000

== 1950–1959 ==
Date Issued	Type	Subject	Plate No.	Image	No. Issued
March 28, 1952	80¢ Red Violet	Diamond Head, Hawaii	24592-4 (3 plate)		18,876,800
May 29, 1953	6¢ Carmine	50 Years of Powered Flight			
September 9, 1954	4¢ Blue	Eagle	25034-35, 40–41 (4 plate)		
August 1, 1957	6¢ Blue	U.S. Air Force, 50th Anniversary	25763		
July 31, 1958	5¢ Red	Eagle	26052		
July 31, 1958	7¢ Blue	Jet Silhouette	26046		
July 31, 1958	7¢ Blue	Jet Silhouette	– small holes		
January 3, 1959	7¢ Blue	Alaska Statehood	26225		
August 17, 1959	7¢ Red & Blue	Jupiter Balloon	26392		
August 21, 1959	7¢ Rose	Hawaii Statehood	26432		
August 27, 1959	10¢ Blue & Red	Pan Am Games	26413		
November 20, 1959	15¢ Orange & Black	Statue of Liberty	26482		

== 1960–1969 ==
Date Issued	Type	Subject	Plate No.	Image
June 10, 1960	10¢ Green & Black	Liberty Bell; Number issued: 39,960,000	26630	
April 22, 1960	25¢ Maroon & Black	Abraham Lincoln	26563	
August 12, 1960	7¢ Red	Jet Silhouette	26714	
October 22, 1960	7¢ Red	Jet Silhouette		
June 28, 1961	13¢ Red & Black	Liberty Bell	26970	
January 13, 1961	15¢ Orange & Black	Statue of Liberty	26878	
December 5, 1962	8¢ Red (Note: Perf 10½ x 11); 400 Subjects	Jetliner Over Capitol Building	– Booklet Pane of 5 + Label; 28024	
December 5, 1962	8¢ Red (Perforated 10 Horizontally)	Jetliner Over Capitol Building		
May 3, 1963	15¢ Red, Brown & Blue	Montgomery Blair; Number issued: 42,245,000; Design: Robert J. Jones	27466	
July 12, 1963	6¢ Red	Eagle; Design: V. S. McCloskey	27390	
July 24, 1963	8¢ Carmine & Maroon	Amelia Earhart; Number issued: 63,890,000; Design: Robert J. Jones	27548	
October 5, 1964	8¢ Blue & Red	Robert Goddard; Number issued: 62,255,000	27861	
March 30, 1967	8¢ Brown	Alaska Purchase; Number issued: 55,710,000	29013	
April 26, 1967	20¢ Multicolored	Audubon "Columbia Jays"; Number issued: more than 50 million	29087	
January 5, 1968	10¢ Red	Runway	29518	
January 5, 1968	10¢ Red	Runway		
April 4, 1968	$1 Multicolored	Airlift		
May 15, 1968	10¢ Red, Blue & Black	50th Anniversary of Air Mail	29673	
November 22, 1968	20¢ Red, Black & Blue	Jet & "USA"	30510	
September 9, 1969	10¢ Multicolored	Moon Landing; Number issued: 152,364,800; Design: Paul Calle	– red omitted – tagging omitted 31378	

== 1970–1979 ==
Date Issued	Type	Subject	Plate No.	Image
May 15, 1971	9¢ Red	Jet Silhouette	32946	
May 7, 1971	11¢ Red	Jet Silhouette	33020	
November 10, 1973	13¢ Red	Winged Letter	34584	
July 13, 1971	17¢ Red, Green & Black	Statue of Liberty	33096	
May 21, 1971	21¢ Red & Blue	USA	33279	
May 7, 1971	11¢ Red (Note: Perf 10 Vertical)	Jet Silhouette		
December 27, 1973	13¢ Red	Winged Letter		
May 3, 1972	11¢ Multicolored	City of Refuge	33463	
August 17, 1972	11¢ Blue, Black, Green, Red & Yellow	Winter Olympics, Sapporo, Skiing	33322-6	
July 10, 1973	11¢ Multicolored	Progress in Electronics	34192	
January 11, 1974	18¢ Black, Red & Blue	Statue of Liberty	34931, 34959	
January 2, 1974	26¢ Black, Red & Blue	Mount Rushmore	34875	
January 2, 1976	25¢ Red, Black & Blue	Plane & Globes	36957	
January 2, 1976	31¢ Red, Black & Blue	Plane & Globes	36981	
September 23, 1978	31¢ Multicolored	Wright Brothers		
September 23, 1978	31¢ Multicolored	Wright Brothers		
March 29, 1979	21¢ Multicolored	Octave Chanute	38856	
March 29, 1979	21¢ Multicolored	Octave Chanute		
November 20, 1979	25¢ Multicolored	Wiley Post	39197	
November 20, 1979	25¢ Multicolored	Wiley Post		
November 1, 1979	31¢ Multicolored	Olympics		

== 1980–1989 ==
Date Issued	Type	Subject	Plate No.	Image
October 13, 1980	40¢ Multicolored	Philip Mazzei	(1980) – perf 10 1/2x11 1/2	
December 30, 1980	28¢ Multicolored	Blanche Stuart Scott		
December 30, 1980	35¢ Multicolored	Glenn Curtiss		
June 17, 1983	28¢ Multicolored	Olympics		
June 17, 1983	28¢ Multicolored	Olympics		
June 17, 1983	28¢ Multicolored	Olympics		
June 17, 1983	28¢ Multicolored	Olympics		
April 8, 1983	40¢ Multicolored	Olympics	– block	
April 8, 1983	40¢ Multicolored	Olympics	– block	
April 8, 1983	40¢ Multicolored	Olympics	– block	
April 8, 1983	40¢ Multicolored	Olympics	– block	
November 4, 1983	35¢ Multicolored	Olympics		
November 4, 1983	35¢ Multicolored	Olympics		
November 4, 1983	35¢ Multicolored	Olympics		
November 4, 1983	35¢ Multicolored	Olympics		
February 13, 1985	33¢ Multicolored	Alfred V. Verville		
February 13, 1985	39¢ Multicolored	Lawrence and Elmer Sperry		
June 10, 1985	44¢ Multicolored	Transpacific 50th Anniversary		
August 22, 1985	44¢ Multicolored	Junipero Serra		
March 29, 1988	44¢ Multicolored	New Sweden Settling		
July 14, 1988	45¢ Multicolored	Samuel P. Langley	– overall tagging	
June 23, 1988	36¢ Multicolored	Igor Sikorsky		
July 14, 1989	45¢ Multicolored	French Revolution		
October 12, 1989	45¢ Multicolored	Pre-Columbian America		
November 27, 1989	45¢ Multicolored	Future Mail Delivery		
November 27, 1989	45¢ Multicolored	Future Mail Delivery		
November 27, 1989	45¢ Multicolored	Future Mail Delivery		
November 27, 1989	45¢ Multicolored	Future Mail Delivery		
November 24, 1989	$1.80 Multicolored	Future Mail Delivery Miniature sheet		

== 1990–2012 ==
Date Issued	Type	Subject	Plate No.	Image
October 12, 1990	45¢ Multicolored	Tropical Coast	_{A1111 UL}	
April 27, 1991	50¢ Multicolored	Harriet Quimby	_{S1111 LL} – Perf 11.2 _{S2222 LR}	
May 17, 1991	40¢ Multicolored	William T. Piper	_{A1111 UL}	
June 21, 1991	50¢ Multicolored	Antarctic Treaty	_{S1111 UR}	
October 12, 1991	50¢ Multicolored	Bering Land Bridge	_{111111 LR}	
1993	40¢ Multicolored	William T. Piper	_{S1111 LR}	
May 12, 1999	48¢ Multicolored	Niagara Falls	_{V11111 UL} (First of the Scenic American Landscapes Series)	
July 30, 1999	40¢ Multicolored	Rio Grande	_{V11111 LR}	
January 20, 2000	60¢ Multicolored	Grand Canyon	_{B1111 UR} – die cutting omitted error _{B1111 UR}	
March 6, 2001	70¢ Multicolored	Nine-Mile Prairie	_{P11111 LL}	
April 17, 2001	80¢ Multicolored	Mount McKinley	_{V11111 UL}	
May 20, 2001	60¢ Multicolored	Acadia National Park	– 2001 year date, prephosphored, die cut 11.25 x 11.5 (B1111 UR) – 2001 year date, overall tagging, die cut 11.5 x 11.9 (B2222 UR) – 2005 year date (S1111 UR) – Acadia error, printed on the backing paper (S1111 LR)	
February 22, 2006	63¢ Multicolored	Bryce Canyon, Utah	_{S22222 LL}	
February 22, 2006	75¢ Multicolored	Great Smoky Mountains	_{P11111 LR}	
February 22, 2006	84¢ Multicolored	Yosemite National Park	_{V11111 UR}	
June 1, 2007	69¢ Multicolored	Okefenokee Swamp National Wildlife Refuge	_{P11111 LL}	
June 1, 2007	90¢ Multicolored	Hagatña Bay, Guam	_{V11111 UR}	
May 16, 2008	72¢ Multicolored	13-Mile Woods, New Hampshire	_{S11111 UL}	
May 16, 2008	94¢ Multicolored	St. John, U.S. Virgin Islands	_{V11111 LL}	
June 28, 2009	79¢ Multicolored	Zion National Park		
June 28, 2009	98¢ Multicolored	Grand Teton National Park		
April 11, 2011	80¢ Multicolored	Voyageurs National Park		
January 19, 2012	85¢ Multicolored	Glacier National Park		
January 20, 2012	$1.05 Multicolored	Lancaster County, Pennsylvania		

== Notes on types ==
Plate type (P notes)
– plate type

Perforation (PERF notes)	Printing Dryness (D notes)
– perforation details, see here for more details	– printing dryness, see also (airmail section)

== See also ==
- Airmails of the United States
- 1930 Graf Zeppelin stamps
