= Label (philately) =

In philately, label or coupon or tab is a part of sheet of stamps separated from them with perforations (or a narrow margin in imperforate stamps). It cannot be used for postage because it does not have face value and any indication of a postal administration that issued such stamps with labels. The notion of label should not be confused with the term "gutter" or with a margin of a stamp sheet.

Sometimes, label is also a stamp-like adhesive of no postal value, often used for promotional purposes.

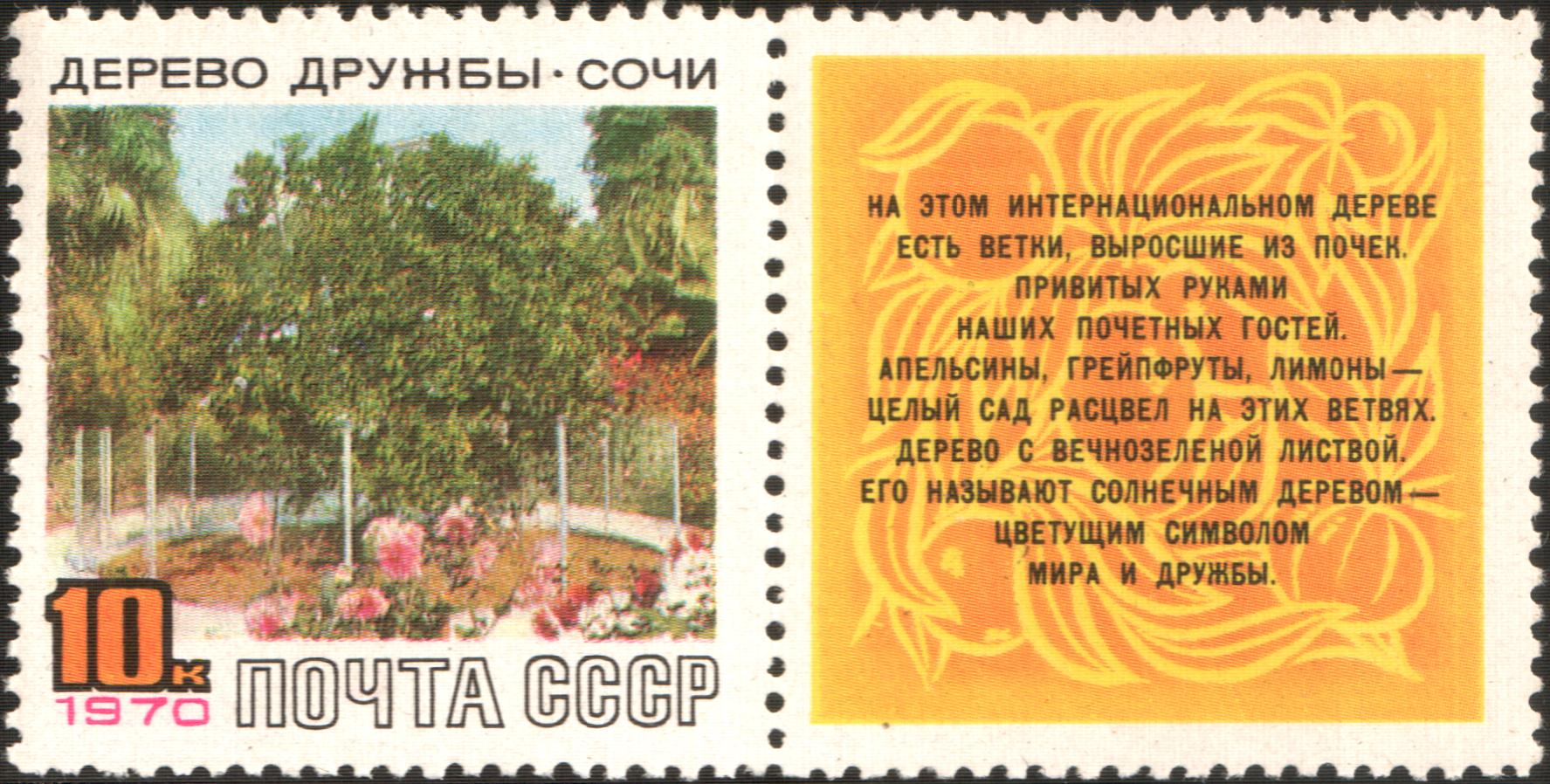
Stamp of the Soviet Union with a label dedicated to the Tree of Friendship in Sochi (1970)

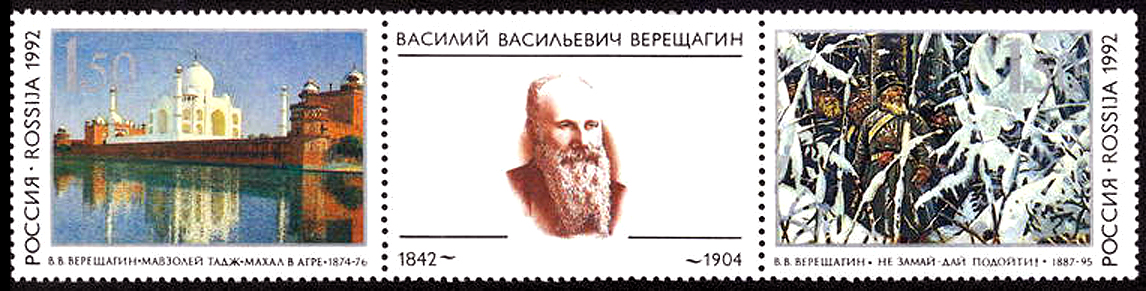
Two stamps of Russia with an intermediate label dedicated to the Russian painter and writer Vasily Vereshchagin (1992)

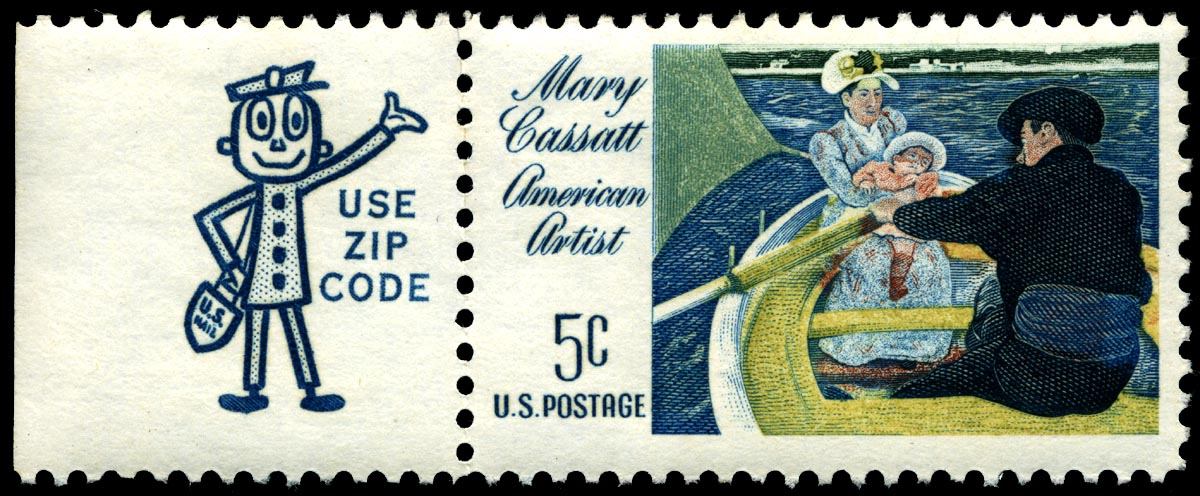
Mr. ZIP on a stamp sheet margin (not a label!). A US postage stamp (1966) featuring "The Boating Party" painted by Mary Cassatt in 1893–1894

== See also ==
- Adhesive label
- Gutter (philately)

== Other websites ==
- Label, AskPhil
