= Adhesive label =

Small piece of paper designed to be affixed to a surface

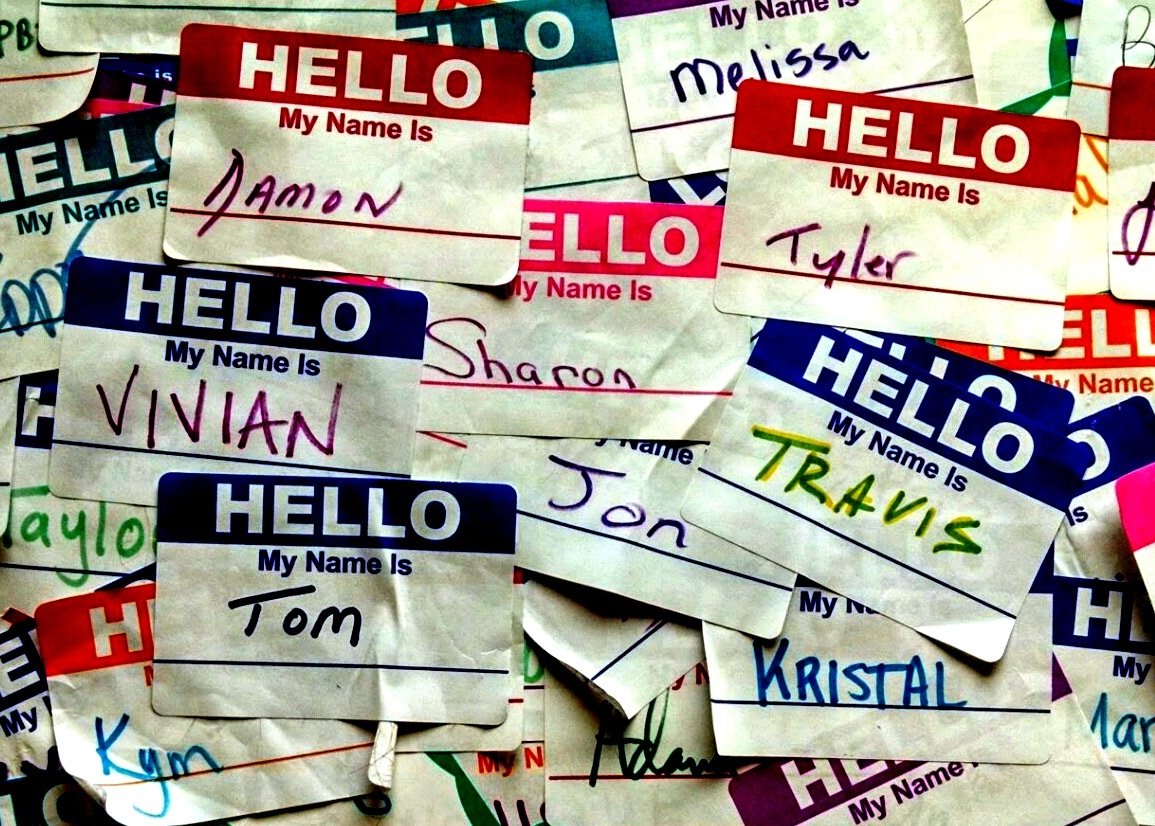
Name tag labels

An adhesive label or sticky label is a small piece of paper designed to be affixed to any surface, typically by exposing a layer of adhesive on the front or back of the label. The term adhesive refers to a sticky substance, while something that is self-adhesive implies that it will stick without wetting or the addition of glue to the product.

One of the most familiar types of adhesive labels is the postage stamp, which was developed in Britain in the 1840s and became popular in the United States within the same decade.

In 1935, R. Stanton Avery invented a machine to manufacture self-adhesive labels. Over time, Avery's invention influenced the ways that manufacturers and brands advertised information on their products. Avery used a die-cutting process, allowing the paper to be cut into a repeated, specific shape, usually a rectangle or a square. In the 1960s, further innovations, increasing demand, and new kinds of adhesives were produced, and self-adhesive labels began to be manufactured on a large scale to a worldwide market. In the 1970s, self-adhesive labels and stickers became mainstream products and were popularized in the form of car decals, bumper stickers, and collectable items.

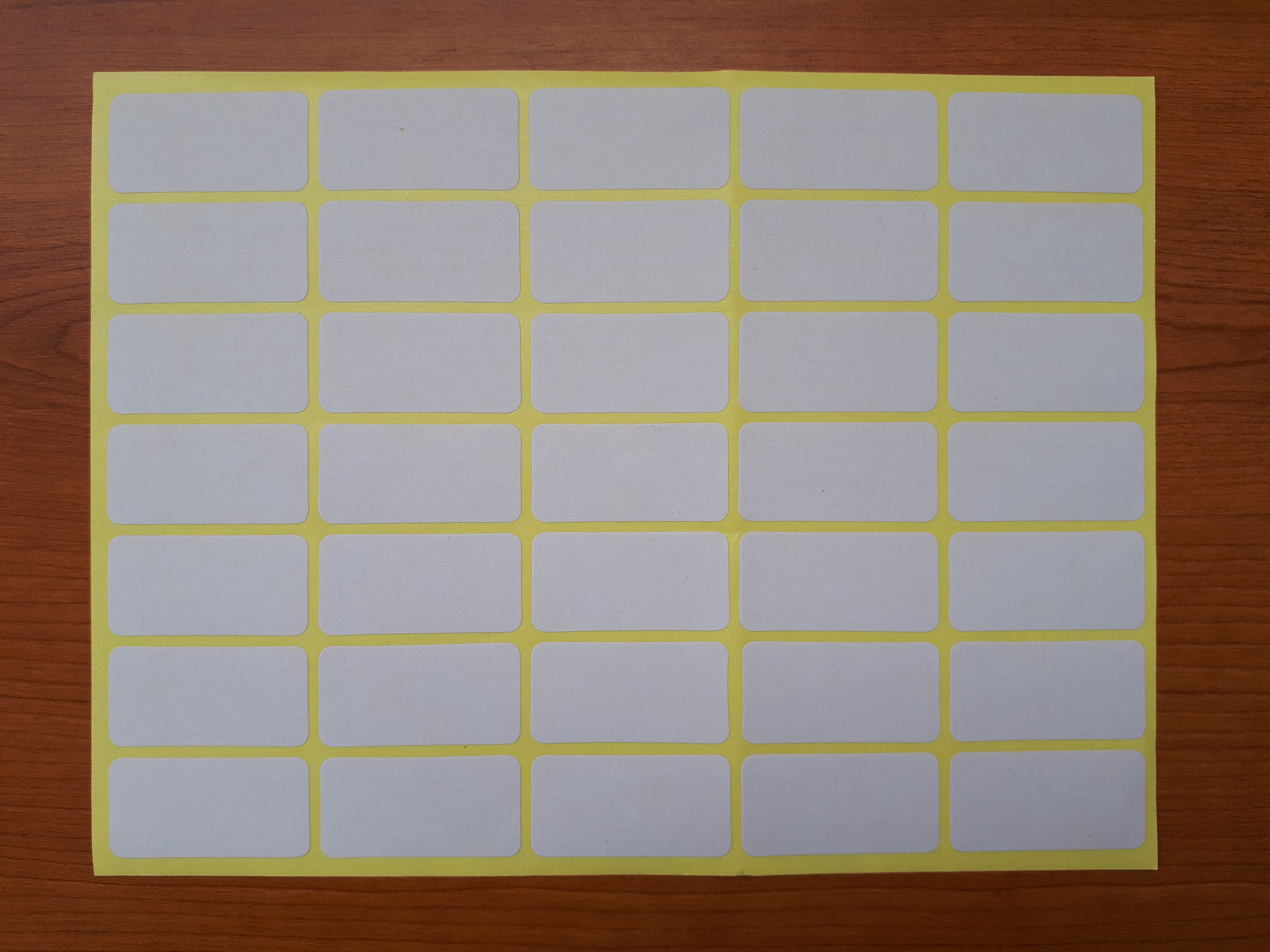
A sheet containing adhesive labels

There are three main classifications for label adhesives: permanent, removable, and repositionable. Each variation has its own unique qualities and uses. The bond strength of each type of adhesive ranges from a strong bond which is permanent, to a flexible bond, which can be repositioned or removed entirely.

The growth, diversity, and popularity of self-adhesive labels have continued into the present day. Advancements in technology and demand for versatile products has led to more innovative materials being used to create more dynamic bonds which are specific to the environment they will be used in. Similarly, there are now a wide variety of materials that are used to create the face material, or front, of the labels. These products include polypropylene, polyester, vinyl, and mrPVC. Adhesive labels may now be produced individually, or in sheets, which case they are usually separated by perforations or rouletting, see postage stamp separation. Digital printing technology is also being used to improve this process. This innovative printing allows for customizable, print-on-demand products and has the capacity to lower costs for manufacturers worldwide. A recent article suggests that an increased consumer awareness paired with developments in technology will result in a strong future for adhesive labels.

The concept has since been extended into a variety of areas:

- On mail: airmail etiquettes, charity labels, address labels, return address labels, postage meter labels, certain types of postal labels
- On other kinds of paper objects: revenue stamps, savings stamps, general markers, notices, or warnings
- Retail products: decorations, stickers, barcodes, price labels, car decals, bumper stickers, and collectible items
- Industrial appliances: direction labels, warning labels
- On food: Nutritional information, allergy warnings, expiration dates
- On medical devices: prescription drug bottles, warning labels, brand information

Almost every imaginable combination of paper products and adhesives have been used at some point to create adhesive labels; see postage stamp paper and postage stamp gum for a more detailed discussion. See postage stamp separation.

== See also ==
- Gutter (philately)
- Label (philately)
