= St. Andrew's cross (philately) =

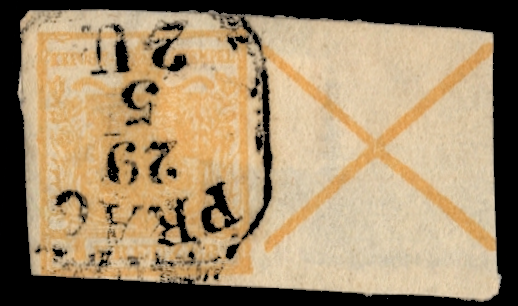
The only known copy of an Austrian 1850 1Kr yellow stamp se-tenant with St. Andrew's cross label. The stamp was cancelled in Prague. This philatelic rarity was sold at auction for € 16,000 on December 6, 2008.

In philately, a St. Andrew's cross is a saltire (an heraldic ordinary) or crossed x design that occurs on some philatelic items; on a few sheets of stamps, censor labels and a few British Forces air letter sheets issued during World War II.

== Stamps ==
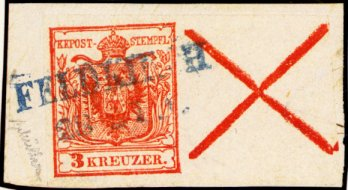
1850 3Kr red stamp se-tenant with St. Andrew's cross label. The stamp was cancelled in Feldkirch.

The first St. Andrew's crosses are found on the first Austrian stamp issue from June 1, 1850 printed by the Vienna State Printing Works. They are colored crosses found in place of the last four stamp positions on each sheet as sold to the public. Leaving the last four labels free created a problem; the blank labels could be used by forgers to produce counterfeit stamps. For that reason, it was decided to make them unusable by printing the St. Andrew's cross design.

The crosses are the same color as their respective stamps and occur in two different types. They are either colored on a white background or the other way around. They are always found in the last row of the sheet and can either be placed in the center or on the left or the right edge.

At the time, the sheet of stamps as printed contained four panes, or counter sheets, each with eight rows and columns with 64 clichés per pane. It was considered important that there not be an uneven payment when several sheets were purchased (for instance, by businesses). The extant Austria currency was the florin, each worth 60 kreutzers. For that reason, the idea of leaving the last four fields of a sheet free was considered. For example, when buying seven 6-kreutzer sheets, the price was 42 florins instead of 44 florins and 48 kreutzers. With the introduction of the new currency in 1858 (100 kreutzers = 1 florin), the St. Andrew's cross was no longer needed and its use was discontinued.

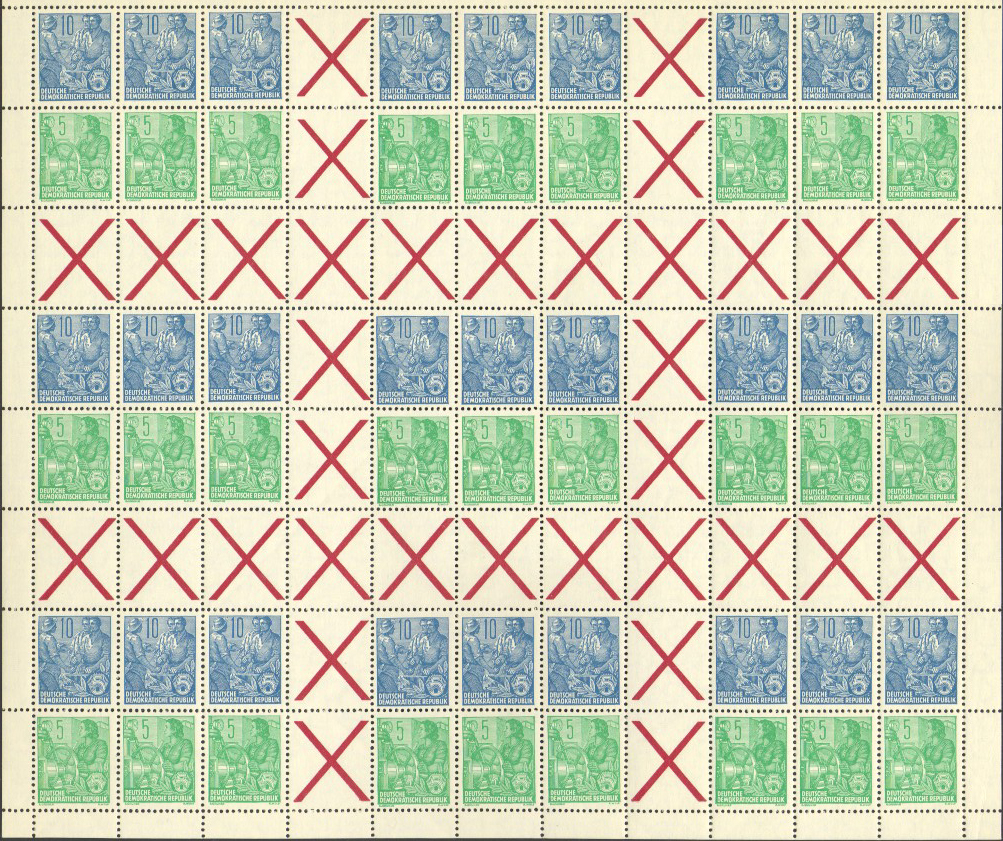
1953 DDR stamp sheet with St. Andrew's cross printed in the gutters

The St. Andrew's crosses were again used for a short time during the 1917 issue of special handling stamps that consisted of 13 rows and eight columns, so that 104 special handling stamps were on a pane. The middle four stamps in the bottom row were replaced by St. Andrew's crosses. The issue and printing of these sheets with St. Andrew's crosses was not originally planned but because of the public disapproval of the triangular predecessor, it was decided to change to horizontal format for this stamp issue.

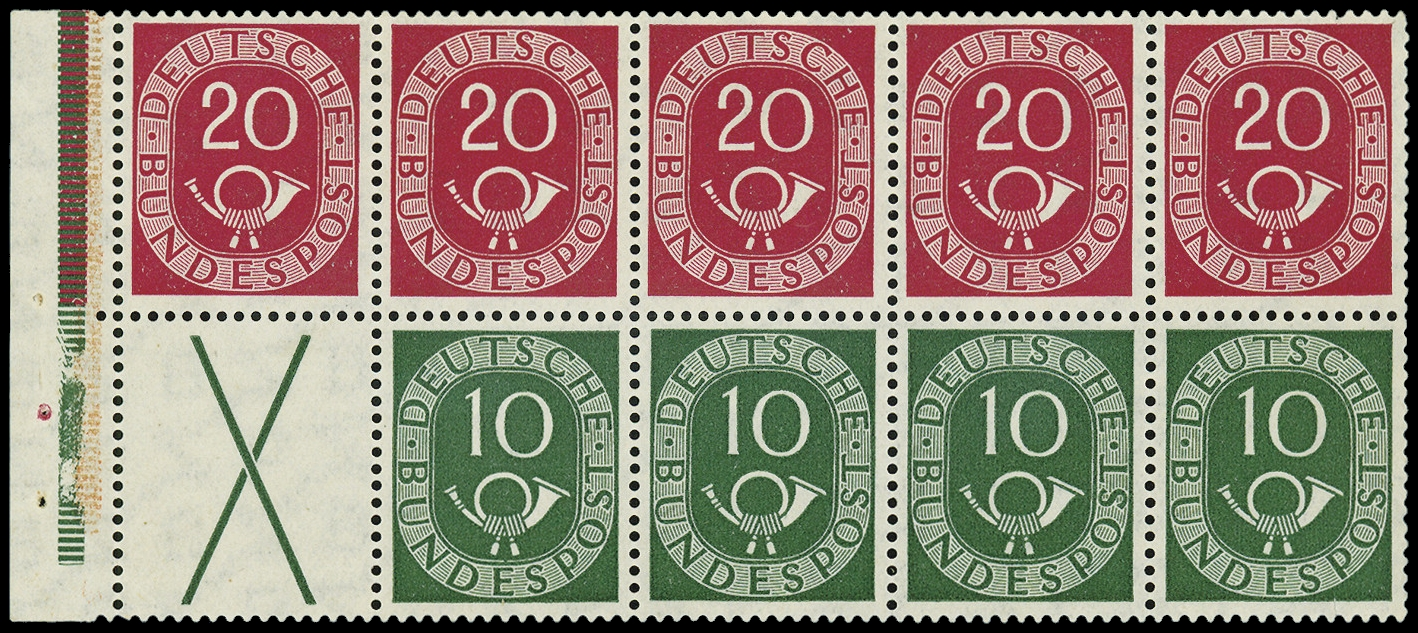
Booklet pane with one St. Andrew's cross

St. Andrew's crosses are very popular with collectors today. However, few St. Andrew's crosses have survived from the first issue still attached to an adjacent stamp. They were hardly noticed at that time and nearly always torn away, or cut off. Some St. Andrew's cross labels were used to seal letters because they were gummed, so there are still several individual pieces or strips of four extant. Because philately was more widespread at that time many more St. Andrew's crosses exist from the 1916 issue.

== Censor labels ==
In the Imperial postal censor station in Bermuda St. Andrew's crosses were usually applied in crayon, red, blue or black, to censor resealing labels or tapes used to seal mail being referred to a DAC, deputy assistant censor, or to another department for evaluation. Some of the crosses were applied after the censor labels had been stuck to the cover due to the cross only showing on the front of the label. These, St. Andrew's cross censor labels are also recorded on Prize court mail that was detained in Bermuda and released or sold after the war, in late 1945 and 1946.

An Imperial censor label, P.C.90, with the censor identity number 1000, occurs with the words "School use ONLY" at the top of a censor label that was used for training purposes. However, the location of use is unclear and could have been in the UK, Gibraltar or Bermuda.

== Air letter ==
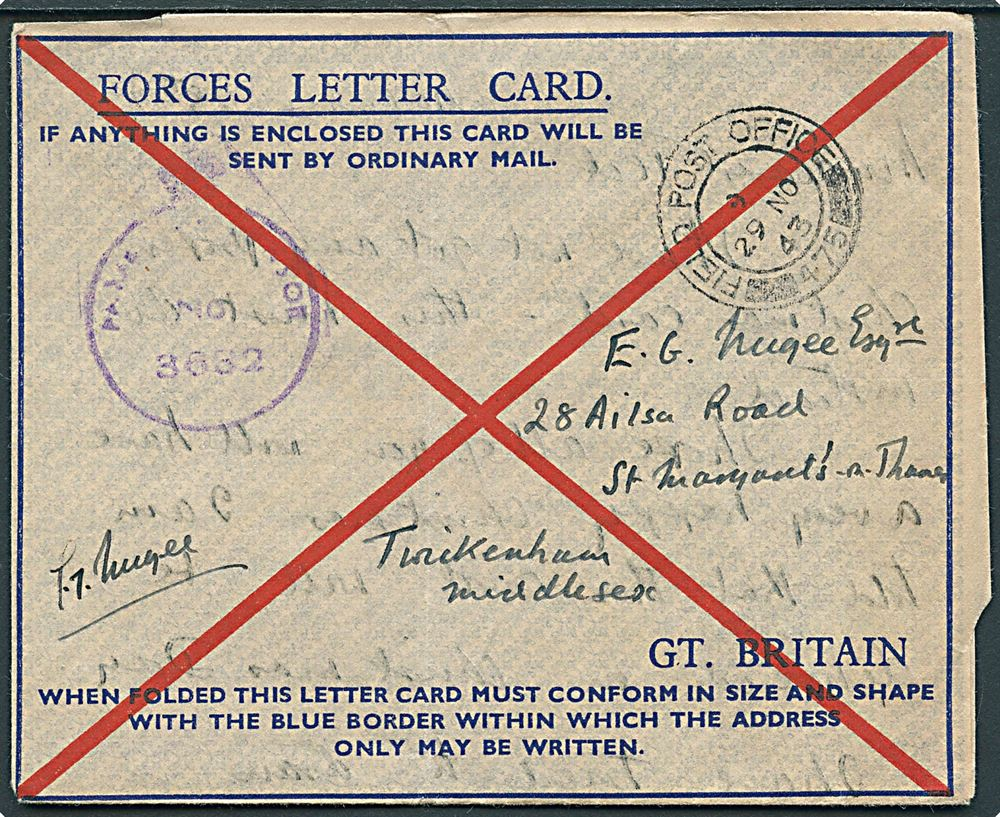
1943 FPO mail from Gibraltar

A postal stationery airmail letter sheet, entitled "Forces Letter Card", now commonly known as an aerogram, was made available during World War II for British military forces and a few were issued with a large St. Andrew's cross printed on the front portion of the air letter.

== See also ==
- X-cancel
