= Sheet of stamps =

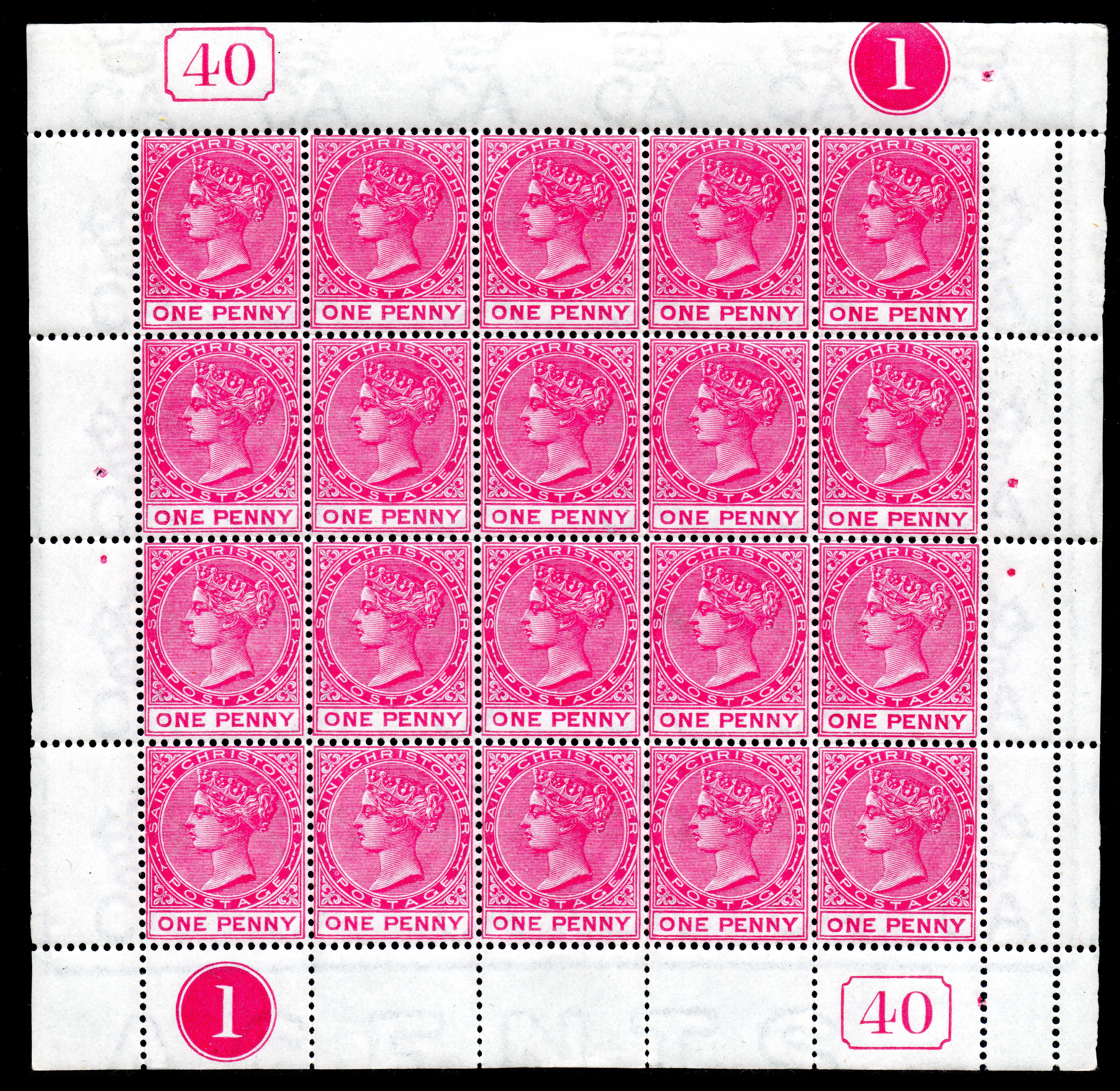
An 1884 sheet of stamps from St. Christopher.

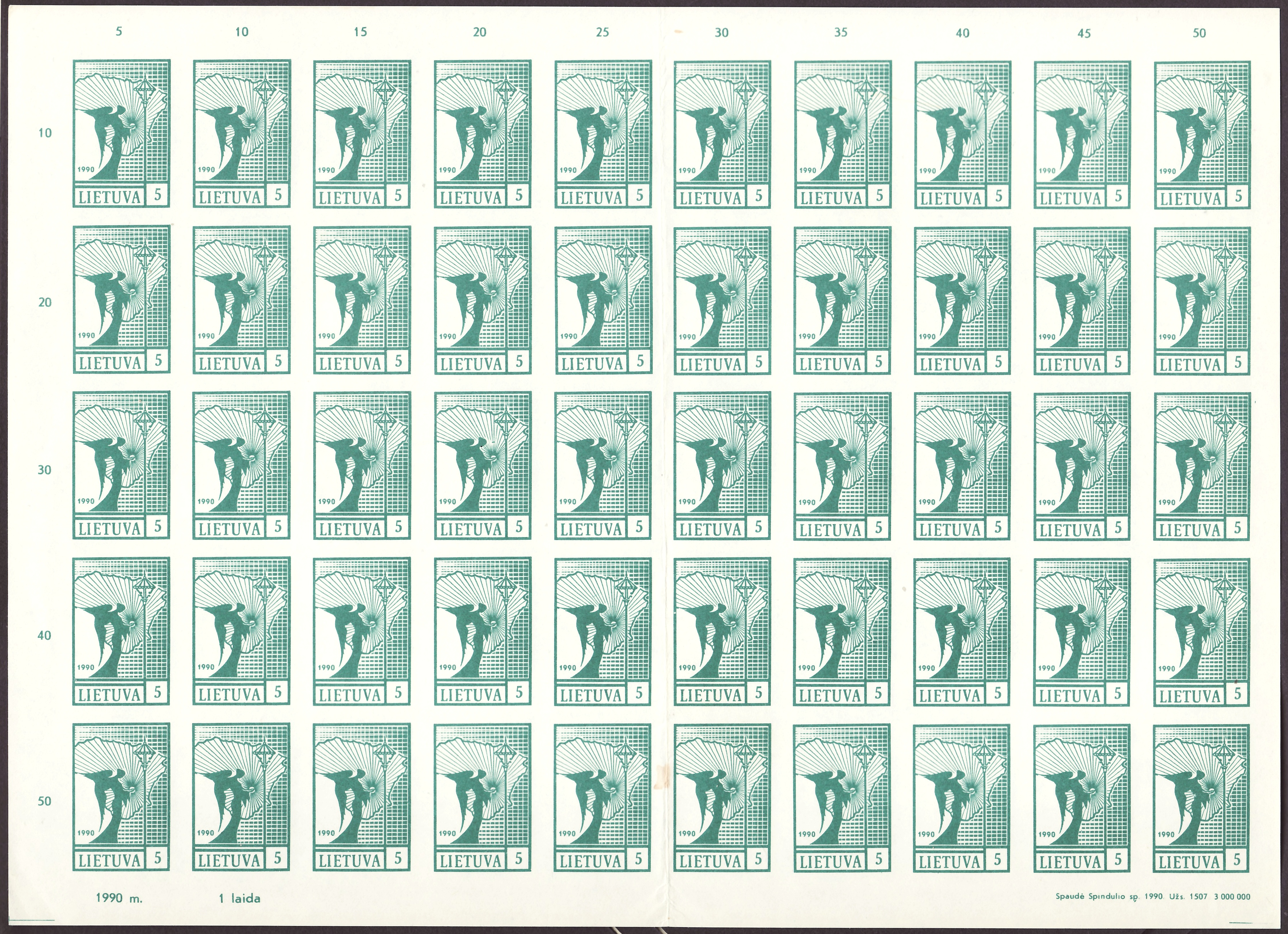
Stamp of Lithuania; 1990; counter sheet with the definitive stamp in the angel-drawing (First Angel Issue), imperforate; without gum; single stamp size 21 x 32 mm

A sheet of stamps or press sheet is a unit of stamps as printed, usually on large sheets of paper based on the size of the printing plate, that are separated into panes that are sold at post offices. Where more than one pane is on a printed sheet they are arranged in a table-like arrangement. The spaces between the single stamps are all of the same size and provide space for a cut or perforation.

== Size and format ==
Today, a sheet of stamps is the most common way of arranging stamps on the impressed paper. The number of stamps on a sheet and the format of the sheet depend on the size and format of the individual stamps. Small stamps are usually printed on sheets of a hundred stamps, although the Penny Black, as with other pre-decimal sterling currency stamps, were printed in sheets of 240; larger stamps are printed on sheets of fifty, twenty-five or twenty, as is done by the USPS.

On November 13, 1994, the Deutsche Post changed the format of its emissions to sheets of ten stamps each, due to reasons of efficiency. The edges of these sheets are specially designed, making them a novel field of collecting.

== Printing sheet ==
In fact, the term printing sheet refers only to a part of the actual printing sheet. This is because stamps are mostly printed in four connected sheets, to make best use of the stamp paper. At the post office counter, only the four separated printing sheets are sold. Therefore, the sheet of stamps is also called a counter sheet or pane, though improperly called a sheet of stamps.

=== Gutters ===
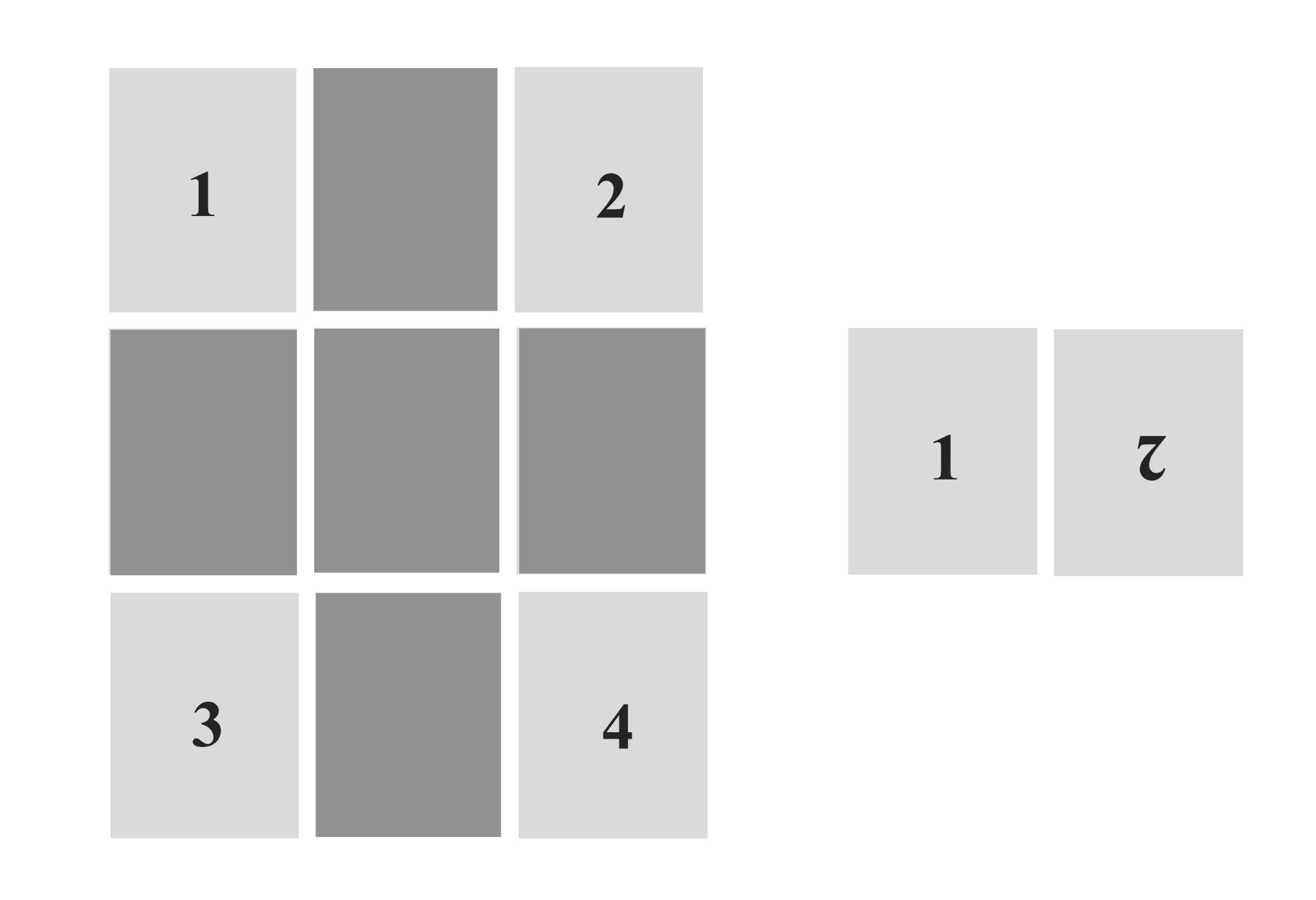
Heart (left) and tête-bêche (right)

The empty fields connecting the single counter sheets are called gutters. Normally they are separated in the middle after printing in order to obtain four counter sheets. The half empty fields or gutters then form the edge of the sheet. However, from many issues, unseparated gutters with connected stamps of the neighbouring sheets come on the market (stamp - empty field - stamp). These gutters may be either empty or printed, if printed edges were intended.

The philatelist makes a distinction between horizontal and vertical gutters. A specific characteristic of the gutters is the heart of the printing sheet, where all four panes are connected. Gutters and hearts are very popular with collectors and reach high catalog prices, especially for classic issues.

=== Tête-bêche ===
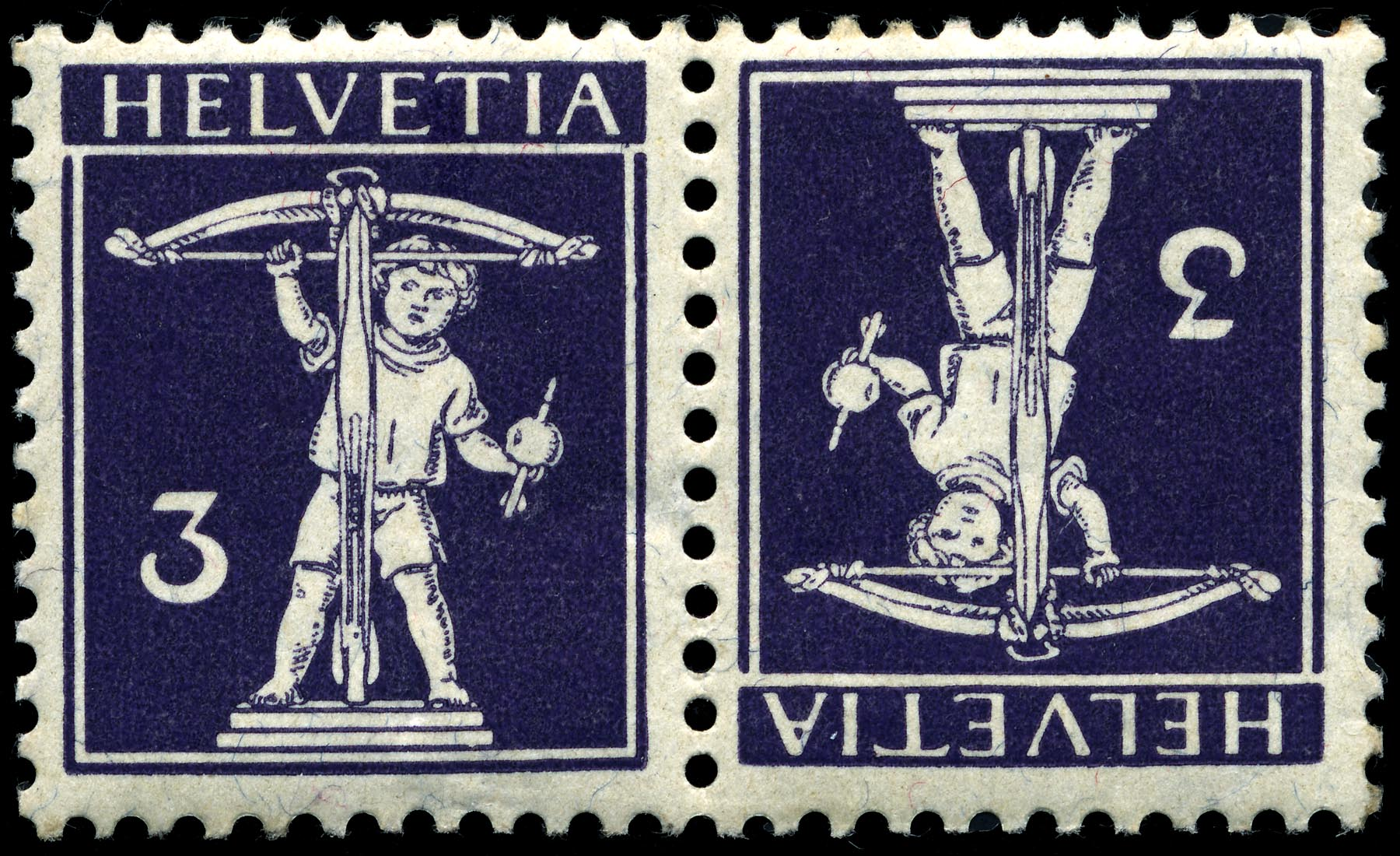
Swiss Tête-bêche

Single counter sheets do not always have to be separated by empty fields. Issues which were not intended to have edges were naturally manufactured without empty fields. To be able to distinguish between the single sheets better, the stamps were printed rotated 180° to each other along the separation line. Philatelists describe the two stamps which are upside down in relationship to each other as tête-bêche. Some issues have tête-bêches as well as gutters.

Like gutters, tête-bêches are very popular with collectors due to their scarcity and decorativeness.

== Stamp arrangement and location ==
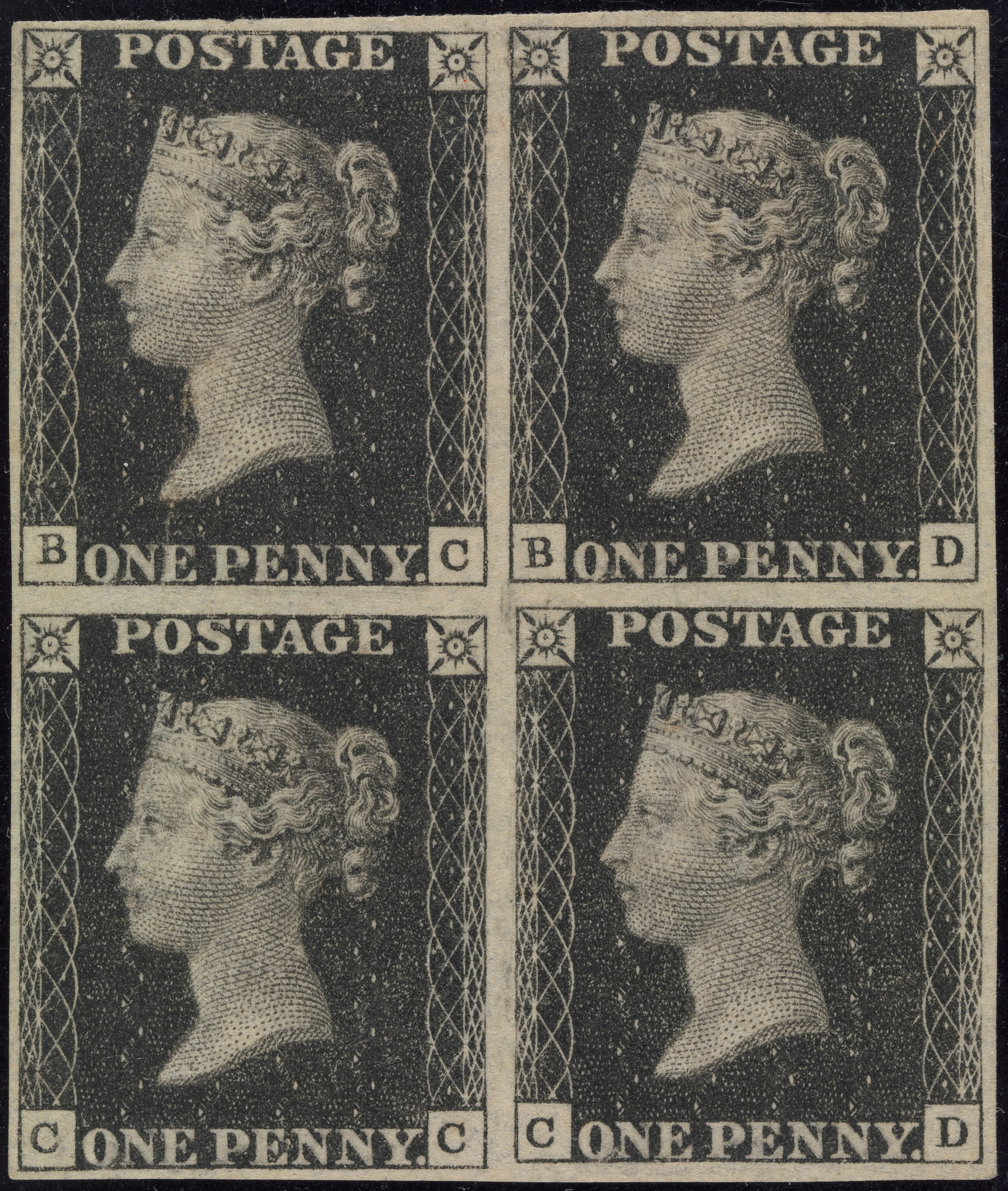
Identifying letters in the bottom corners of the Penny Black

The stamps are arranged on the sheet in a table with rows and columns. Due to this arrangement, the location of each stamp can be precisely determined. The philatelist counts the single stamps horizontally from left to right, but the post counts them vertically from top to bottom. Accordingly, the third stamp in the sixth row of a sheet of 10 x 10 would be the 53rd stamp of the sheet for the collector, but the 26th stamp for the post.

The first postage stamps of the UK, the Penny Black, were printed in sheets of 20 rows and 12 columns, but the location on the sheet was indicated by different letters in the bottom corners of each stamp. An "A" in the lower left corner indicated the first row, a "B" the second one, the "C" the third one, etc. The columns were indicated according to the same scheme in the lower right corner. Thus the top left stamp had the letter combination "A" - "A", the bottom right stamp had "T" - "L". As a result, 240 different stamps were made for each plate used. This was intended to prevent forgery.

== Sheet edge ==
The term "sheet edge" refers to the empty fields connected to the stamps and arranged around the sheet. These fields are often unprinted. However, in many cases, quite a bit of interesting information can be found on them, e.g. printing dates or the like. The most important inscriptions printed on the edges of the sheet are:

- number of the edition
- sheet inscription (advertisements, information about the stamp issue, etc.)
- printing dates
- internal numbers
- registration marks
- plate numbers
- banding
- counter of the row value

== Specialities ==
There are several specialities of the printing of sheets. The most important are:

- St. Andrew's crosses
- Se-tenants

== See also ==
- Miniature sheet
- Postage stamp booklet
- Coil stamp
