= Centro de hoja =

A centro de hoja (center of the sheet) from Cuba, 1935.

A 25 stamp centro de hoja (center of the sheet) from Cuba, 1941.

Centro de hoja or Center of the sheet is a kind of Cuban postage stamps where there are intersecting gutters between four panes of stamps. The horizontal and vertical blank gutters divide the sheet into quadrants of 25 stamps each. The center four or sixteen stamps on a sheet of 100 stamps are collected similar to how plate blocks of four stamps are collected in the United States. The first centro de hoja were the imperforate Cuban patriots issues of 1926. These had the unique distinctions of being from sheets of 400 rather than 100 and the "gutters" consisted of nothing more than two intersecting lines drawn through the center of the sheet. The last was produced with the three bicentennial of coffee issues of 1952. Some people classify the Christmas issues of 1960 as centros de hoja, but since they have no gutters others call them special format stamps.

A little over half of the regular issues, special delivery and airmail stamps issued between the years 1926 and 1952 were produced with intersecting gutters, giving rise to the collection of centros de hoja. Some issues can be quite rare. There were only 200 imperforate sheets issued in 1936 for each of the fourteen stamps issued to celebrate the opening of the free port of Matanzas. Some of the "writers and artists" series of 1937 sold fewer that 180 sheets. There were only 250 sheets printed of the one peso "death of Maceo" stamp in 1948 and the one peso Fernando Figueredo overprint of 1952. Other issues can be plentiful and readily available to collectors.
