= Postage stamp block =

Group of two or more unseparated stamps

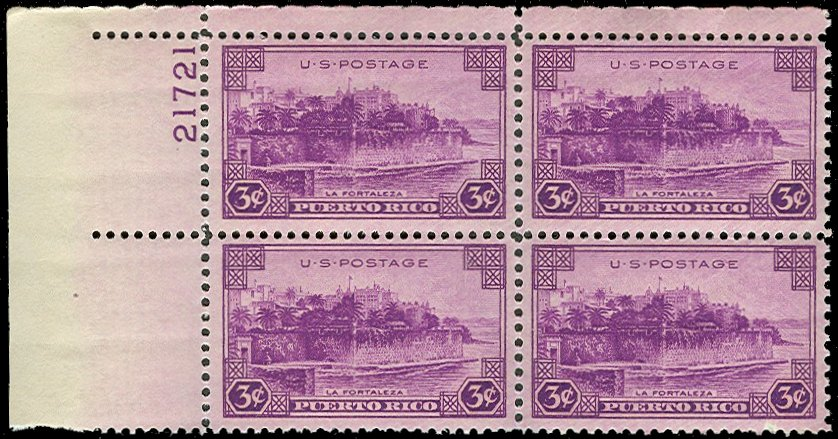
Plate Block

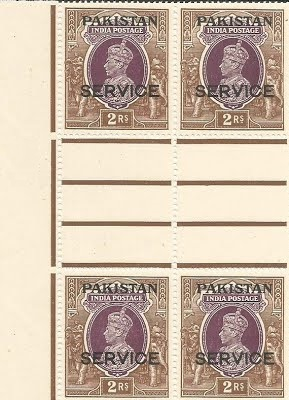
Gutter Block

In philately, a block is a group of two or more un-separated stamps. Blocks are of interest not only because they are rarer than individual stamps, but they also preserve relative positions of stamps as they were originally printed, information that is crucial to understanding how the stamps were produced.

== Format ==
Blocks of stamps from the edges of the original sheet or pane often include sections of the sheet's margin, which may have a wide variety of information. For instance, arrow blocks preserve the guide lines used by line up the sheets for perforation or other production steps (these are usually angled in an arrow shape, thus the name), and center line blocks includes lines printed down the middle of a sheet. An imprint block includes the name of the printer, while for many United States stamps the zip block includes a promotional mention of the ZIP code.

Typical examples of blocks are:

Traffic Lights Block

Traffic Lights block contains the color registration markings in the stamp margins.

Imprint Block

Imprint block contains the name of printer in either bottom or top margin of the stamp sheet.

Plate Block

The most commonly collected kind of block is the plate block, which includes the part of the margin where the serial numbers of the printing plates may be found.

Gutter Block

Gutter block contains stamp margins which are normally at corners of stamps are in the centre of block of stamps.

== Values ==
Although blocks of rare stamps are highly valued, a block's price may actually be so high that no buyers can be found, leaving the owner with the agonizing prospect of breaking up the block, so as to be able to sell the stamps individually. In some cases, dealers have publicized plans to break up a famous block, in the hopes of that someone will come forward to save the block from destruction.

== See also ==
- Centro de hoja, a center of the sheet block of stamps
- Plate block
