= 1930 Graf Zeppelin stamps =

Trio of airmail postage stamps

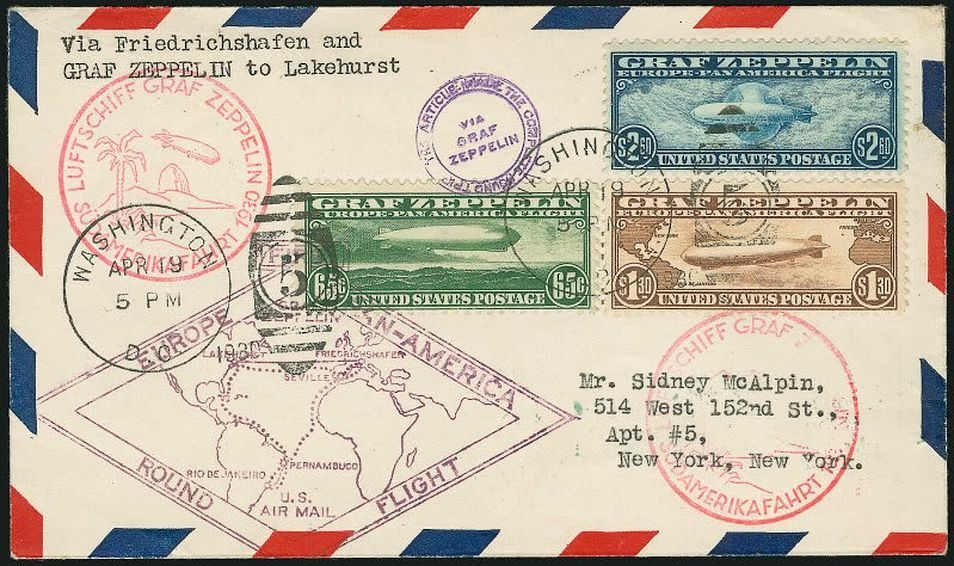
Mail carried aboard the Graf Zeppelin airship bearing three U.S. Graf Zeppelin airmail stamps, first issued in Washington DC, April 19, 1930

The 1930 Graf Zeppelin stamps were a set of three airmail postage stamps, each depicting the image of the Graf Zeppelin, issued by the United States Post Office Department in 1930, exclusively for delivery of mail carried aboard that airship. Although the stamps were valid for postage on mail sent on the Zeppelin Pan American flight from Germany to the United States, via Brazil, the set was marketed to collectors and was largely intended to promote the route. 93.5% of the revenue generated by the sale of these stamps went to the Zeppelin Airship Works in Germany. The Graf Zeppelin stamps were issued as a gesture of goodwill toward Germany. The three stamps were used briefly and then withdrawn from sale. The remainder of the stock was destroyed by the Post Office Department. Due to the high cost of the stamps during the Great Depression, most collectors and the general public could not afford them. Consequently, only about 227,000 of the stamps were sold, just 7% of the total printed, making them relatively scarce and prized by collectors.

== Conception and design ==
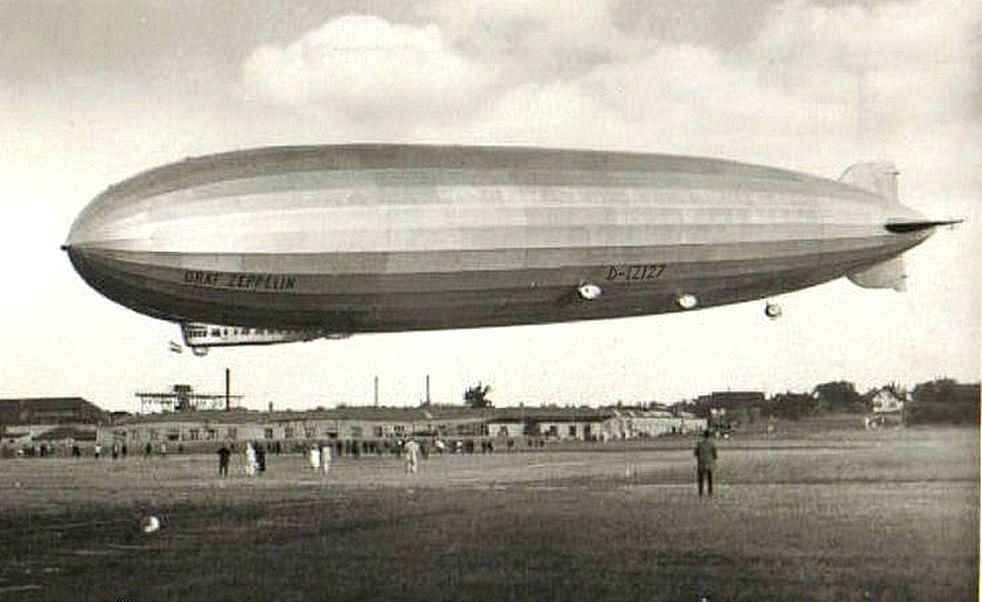
Graf Zeppelin D-LZ127, 1928 This particular airship was used as the model for the engraving of this 2.60 zeppelin issue, where airship number "D-LZ127" can be discerned on the Zeppelin image

In 1928 the Graf Zeppelin debuted and set new long-distance airship records. In honor of its achievements, the Zeppelin Company planned for the Graf Zeppelin to fly to Rio de Janeiro. (Note: Koestler was the only journalist on board. He describes the preparations and the voyage itself in detail in his autobiography.)

In an agreement with The German Zeppelin Airship Works and as a goodwill gesture toward Germany, the United States Post Office produced a set of three airmail postage stamps that commemorated the Graf Zeppelin and the coming transatlantic flight, which were used to pay the postage for mail carried aboard the Zeppelin, a rigid airship that was over 775 feet (236 m) long. Mail would be carried and delivered from Germany to points in North and South America and back again.

The three stamps all featured the Graf Zeppelin in various configurations. All three stamps were first issued in Washington, D.C., on April 19, 1930, one month before the historic trans-Atlantic first flight was made. The stamps were placed on sale at other selected post offices on April 21, 1930.

The Graf Zeppelin departed from Friedrichshafen, Germany on May 30, 1930, and returned on June 6. The 65-cent and $1.30 values were used to pay postage for postcards and letters, respectively, that were carried on the last leg of the journey from the United States to Seville, Spain and Friedrichshafen. The $1.30 and $2.60 stamps paid the postage for postcards and letters, respectively, that were carried on the round trip flight via Friedrichshafen or Seville. The round trip letter rate was $3.90, the exact amount which could be paid with the $2.60 and $1.30 stamps. Mail franked with the Zeppelin stamps was forwarded to Germany by boat where it was picked up at Friedrichshafen and put aboard the Graf Zeppelin. The week-long flight of the Graf Zeppelin extended from Germany to Brazil and on to the United States and then returned to Friedrichshafen.

The stamps were printed by the Bureau of Engraving and Printing, which had only six weeks to design, print and distribute the issues to customers for use on mail to Germany in time for the departing flight. However, the U.S. Post Office would receive only a small profit of 6.5% of the stamps' denomination for letters that would actually be carried aboard the Graf Zeppelin. The German Zeppelin Airship Works would receive most of the profit for those stamps that were actually used to pay postage and were carried by their airship. The U.S. Post Office agreed to issue the stamps anticipating that most of the stamps sold would be to stamp collectors eager to add the new stamps to their stamp collections, and consequently would be retaining all of the revenue generated from those sales.

The Bureau of Engraving and Printing created plates of two hundred postage stamps divided into four panes of fifty stamps each. The panes were perforated with 11 gauge perforations. Because a margin (selvage) of paper extended around all four sides of each pane there are no stamps with straight edges.

A total of 1,000,000 of each denomination were printed, but only 227,260 stamps in all were sold, or 7% of the total. The Zeppelin stamps were withdrawn from sale on June 30, 1930, and the remaining stocks were destroyed by the Post Office Department.

The set of three stamps shared a common border design inscribed with the words GRAF ZEPPELIN (first row) and EUROPE – PAN AMERICAN FLIGHT (second row) in upper case letters near the top of the border, and with the words UNITED STATES POSTAGE, also in upper case, along the bottom border. The stamps were printed in different colors for each denomination. The attractive stamps were highly publicized but were considered controversial among some collectors and others who refused to purchase these issues, complaining that the Post Office was charging too much while at the same time trying to drive up the demand for these stamps by destroying the unsold issues. The $4.55 face value for the set of three stamps was a significant amount of money during the Great Depression. However, over time, these stamps increased in popularity. They became highly sought after by stamp and postal history collectors and remain so today.

=== 65¢ Graf Zeppelin over the Atlantic ===
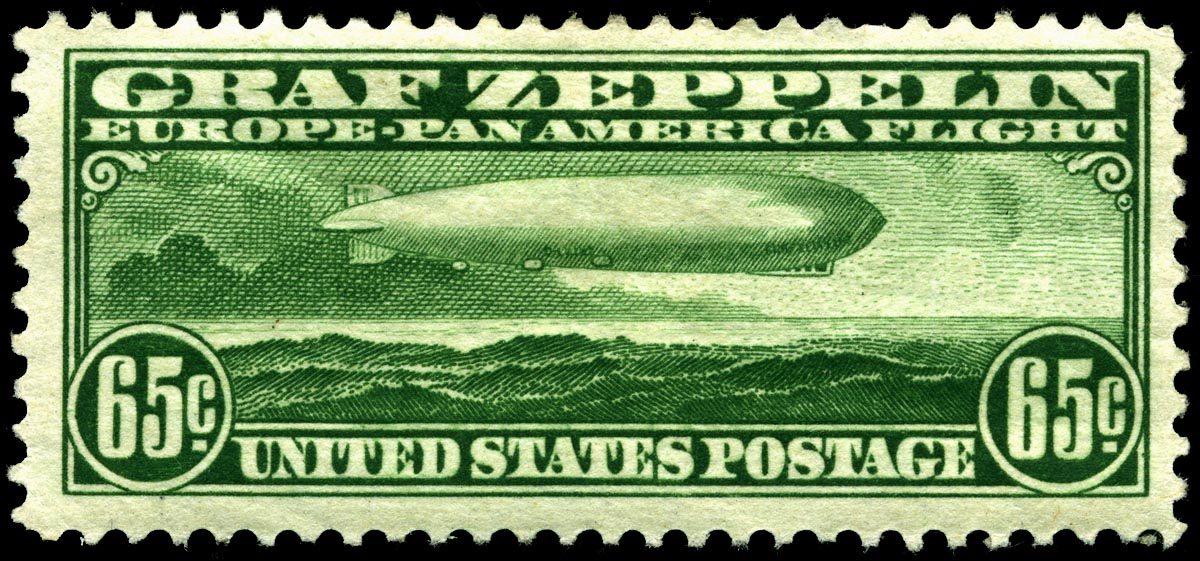

The green 65-cent stamp depicts the Graf Zeppelin flying eastward over the Atlantic Ocean. Like the other two denominations, its inscription along the top reads GRAF ZEPPELIN – EUROPE PAN AMERICAN FLIGHT, and UNITED STATES POSTAGE along the bottom. The lowest of the three denominations, this issue paid the post card rate. The Scott catalog number (Note: Scott's Catalogue and its numbering system is widely recognized and used among stamp collectors and dealers.) for this issue is C13. Out of 1,000,000 stamps printed, 93,336 were sold.

=== $1.30 Graf Zeppelin and map of Atlantic Ocean ===
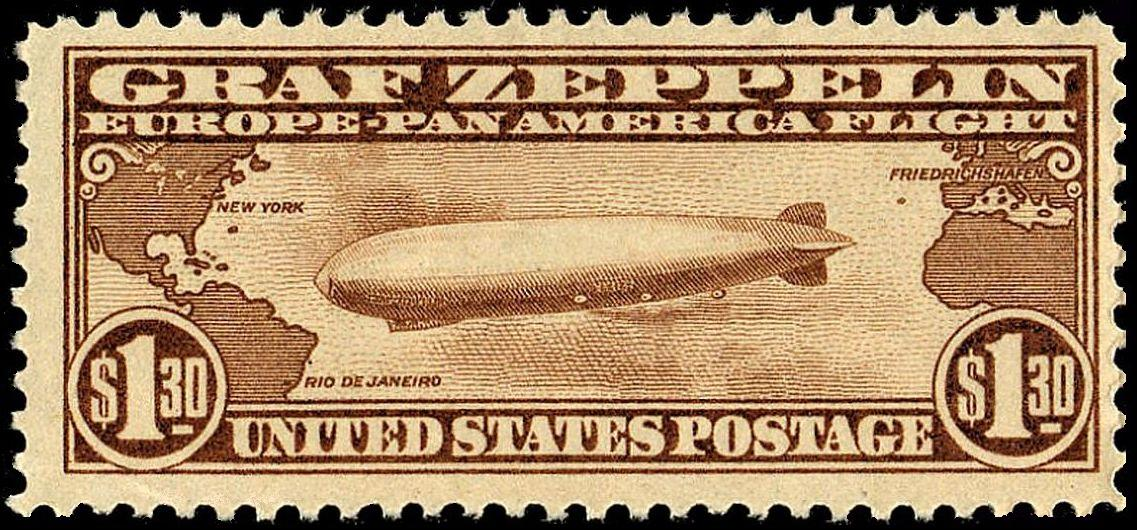

The $1.30 stamp was first issued in Washington, D.C., on April 19, 1930. The stamp was printed in brown and depicts the Graf Zeppelin flying westward, superimposed over a map of the continents of Europe and South and North America with the names of various cities shown. This issue paid the postcard and letter rates on the May 1930 Pan American flight that departed from Germany, flying to Brazil and then the United States. Postage rates depended on the distance between points along the route. The Scott catalog number for this issue is C14. Out of 1,000,000 stamps printed, only 72,428 were sold.

=== $2.60 Graf Zeppelin and globe ===
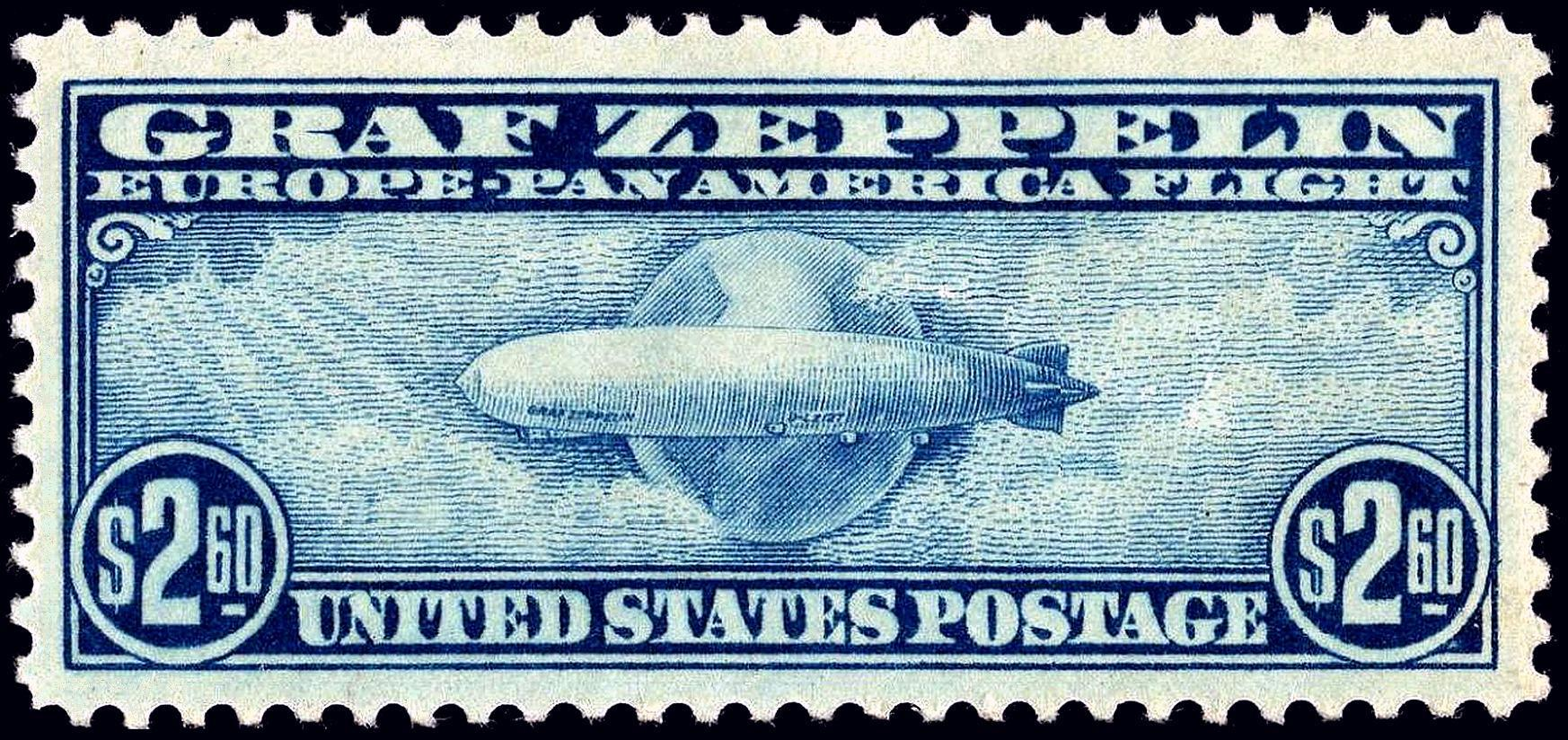

The blue $2.60 stamp depicts the Graf Zeppelin among clouds, superimposed over a globe and traveling toward the west. This issue was designed by C. A. Huston and A. R. Meissner. The Scott catalog number for this issue is C15. Out of 1,000,000 stamps printed, only 61,296 were sold.

=== Other configurations ===
The Graf Zeppelin stamps of 1930 were issued in sheets of fifty. Each sheet had a "plate number" inscribed in the margin of the sheet.

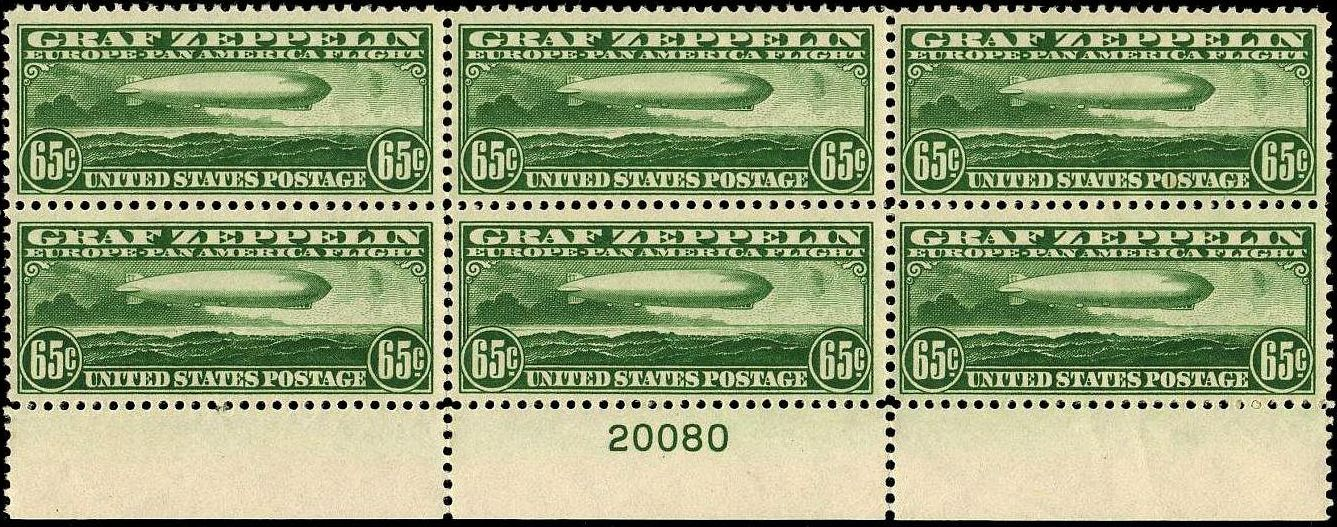
Bottom Plate block from sheet of 65-cent Zeppelin stamps

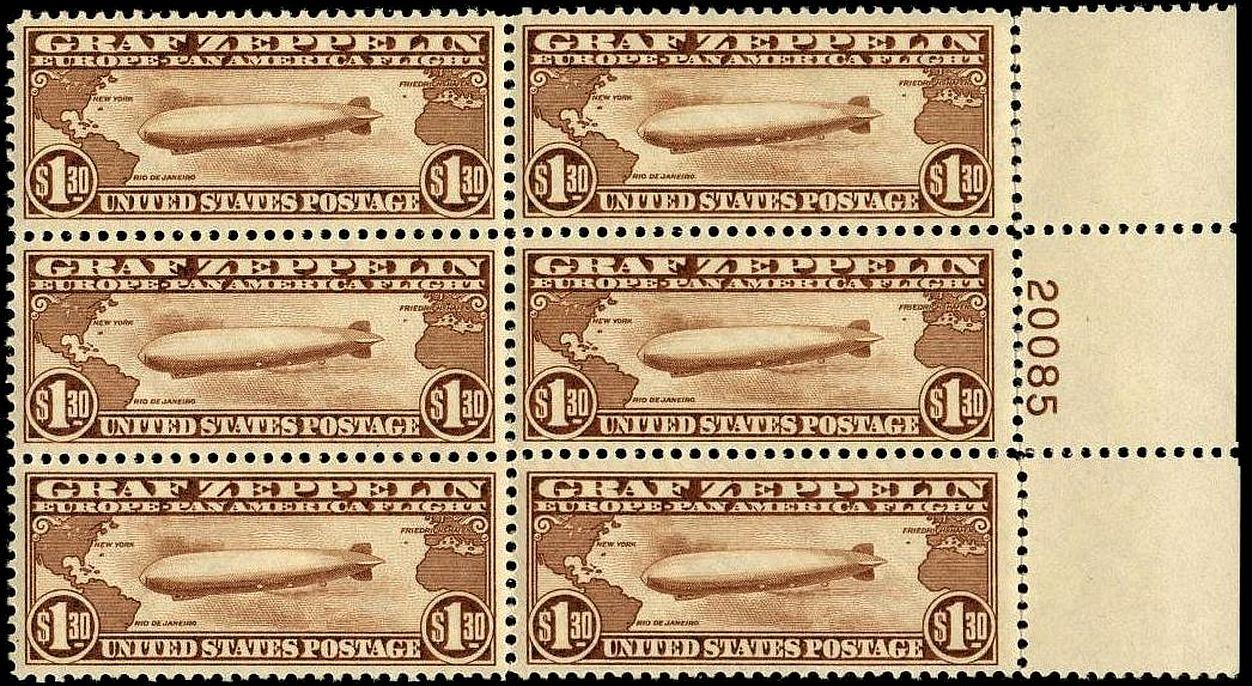
Plate Block of six stamps A plate block is a portion of four or more stamps taken from a complete sheet of stamps, in 'block' form, including a margin with a plate number that designates a particular printing run.

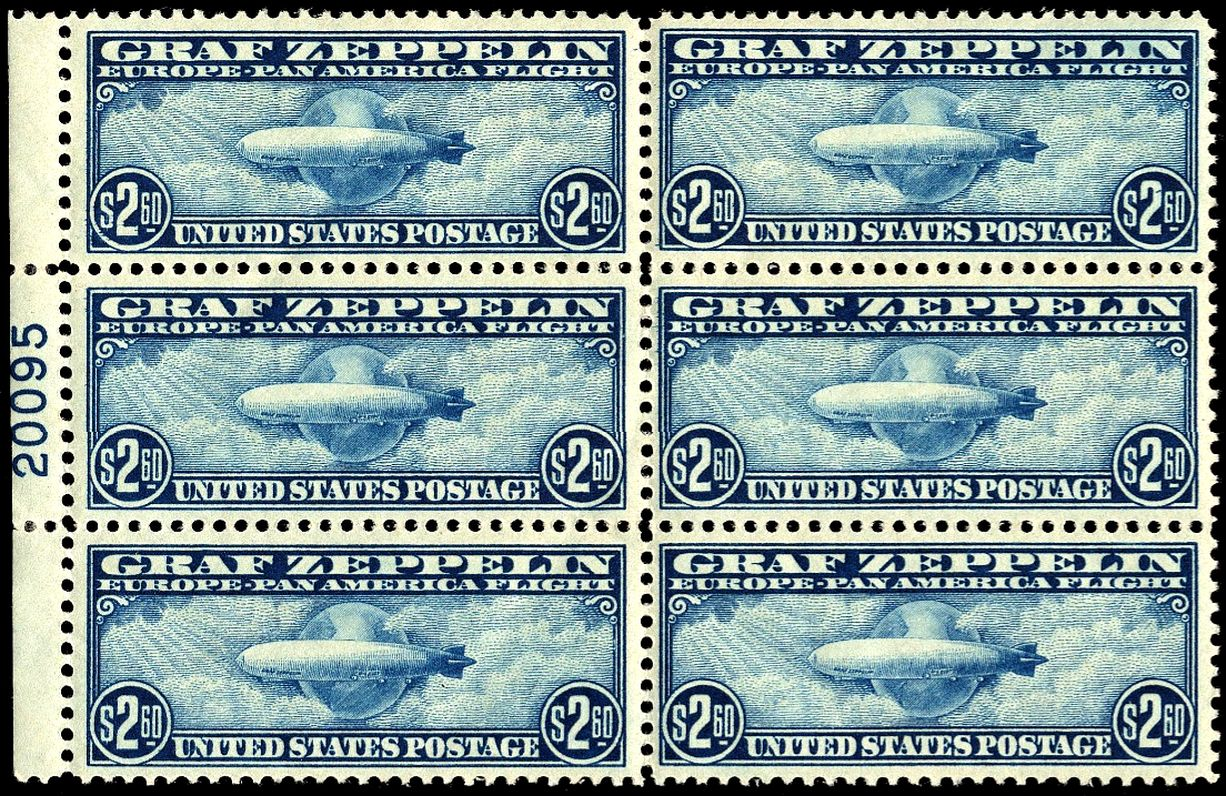
Plate Block of six, Graf Zeppelin, $2.60, 1930 issue

=== Similar stamp ===
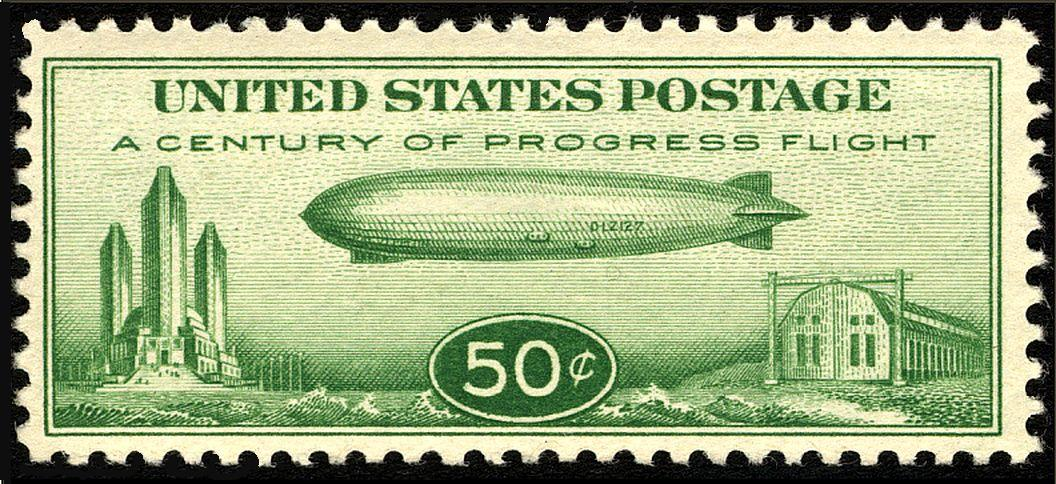
"Baby Zeppelin" stamp of 1933

A 50-cent Zeppelin stamp, often referred to by collectors as the "Baby Zeppelin", was released October 2, 1933, for the Century of Progress exhibition, of which 324,700 were issued. It should not be confused with the Zeppelin stamps that were issued in 1930. With a far higher number available to collectors, it is also considerably less expensive than the 1930 issues.

== US Zeppelin mail ==
Over a five-year period the Graf Zeppelin and Hindenburg flew scheduled airmail flights delivering mail across the Atlantic Ocean between the United States and points in Europe. At the time conventional fix-wing aircraft were not yet readily available where they could be used to fly such a distance on a regular basis.

Mail flown by the Graf Zeppelin airship received special cancellations and cachets. Two of the covers depicted below made the complete round trip, bearing all three Zeppelin stamps attached to a 5-cent Air Post envelope that received special hand-stamped cachets. The diamond shaped cachet depicts a map showing the route used by the Graf Zeppelin on its first flight, and a red cancellation specially made to cancel mail it carried, bearing the name of and used in Friedrichshafen, along with an image of the Zeppelin. The great cost of the famous round the world flight of 1929 was offset by the abundance of souvenir mail carried by the Graf Zeppelin. A U.S. stamped letter flown on the entire round trip from Lakehurst, New Jersey back to Lakehurst required $3.55 (equivalent to $56 in 2021) in postage, which is the total amount of the three zeppelin stamps issued in 1930 thereafter.

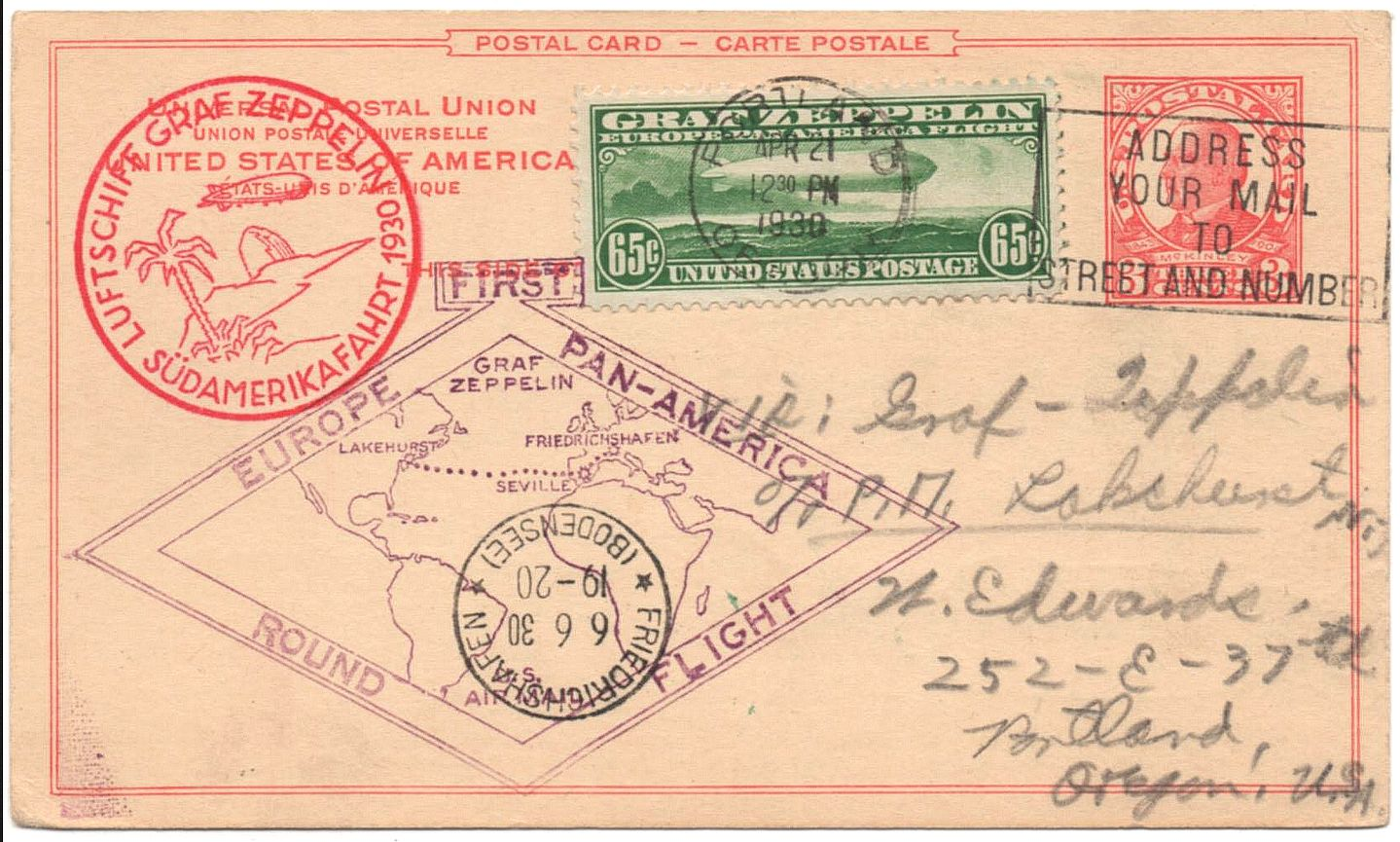
File:First Pan American flight from Portland Oregon to Friedrichshafen Germany, 1930

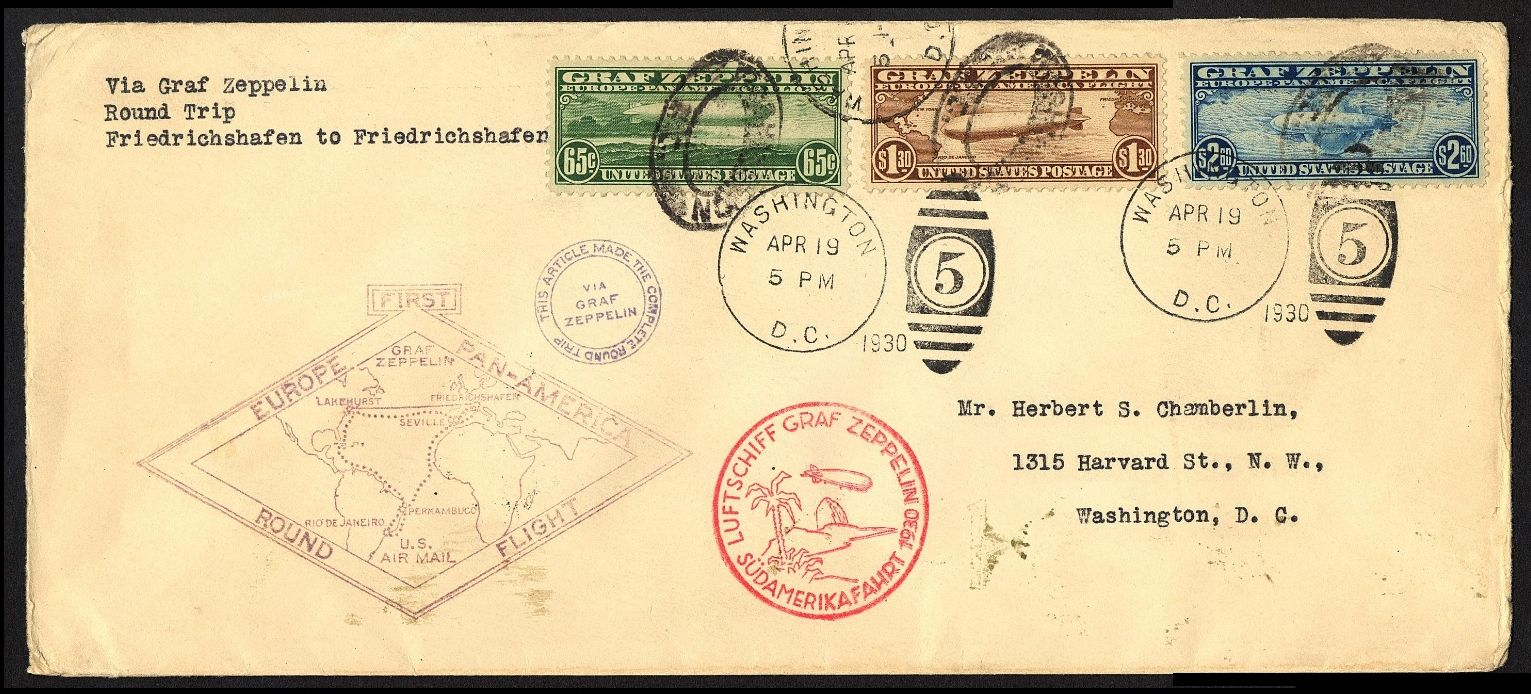
James Farley, while serving as Postmaster General of the United States (1933–1940) under Franklin D. Roosevelt, donated this cover to the Smithsonian Institution from his personal collection.

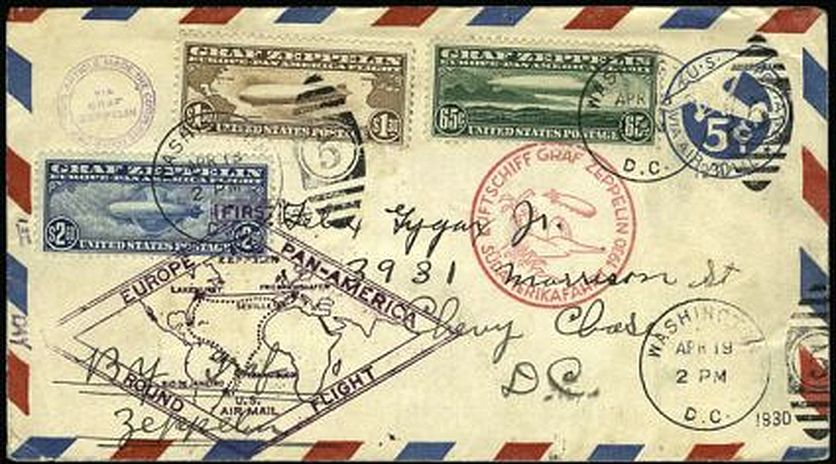
Flown first day cover, April 19, 1930

== See also ==
- Airmails of the United States
- Commemorative stamp
- List of United States airmail stamps
- Postage stamps and postal history of the United States

== Bibliography ==
- Preston, Dickson. "Commercial Zeppelin Mail". American Air Mail Society.
- "U.S. Graf Zeppelin Stamps". Kenmore Stamp Company.
- Dziadecki, John, ed. (2012). "US "Graf Zeppelin" Air-Mail Stamps – Issue of 1930". Colorado University.
- Hatcher, James B.; Cummings, William W., eds. (1981). Scott Specialized Catalogue of United States Stamps, 1982. New York: Scott Publishing Company.
- "1930 Graf Zeppelins, 3 stamps – Catalog # C13-15". Mystic Stamp Company.
- "What are Scott numbers?". Mystic Stamp company.
- "Flown First Day Cover of the Graf Zeppelin Set". Robert A, Siegal Auction Gallieries Inc.
- "65-cent Zeppelin Over Atlantic Ocean". Smithsonian National Postal Museum. Archived from the original on June 1, 2014.
- ""Graf Zeppelin" Pan American Flight cover". Smithsonian National Postal Museum.
- "$1.30 Zeppelin Between Continents". Smithsonian National Postal Museum. Archived from the original on September 20, 2006.
- "$2.60 Zeppelin Passing Globe". Smithsonian National Postal Museum. Archived from the original on September 20, 2006.
- Round the world flight - LZ 127 Graf Zeppelin Airship Story. Strato Studio. 2022.
- "Zeppelin Flown Covers of the World". Stamps of the World.
- Scott Specialized Catalogue of United States Stamps. New York, NY: Scott Publishing Company. 2024.
