= Plate block =

Block of stamps showing plate identifying marks

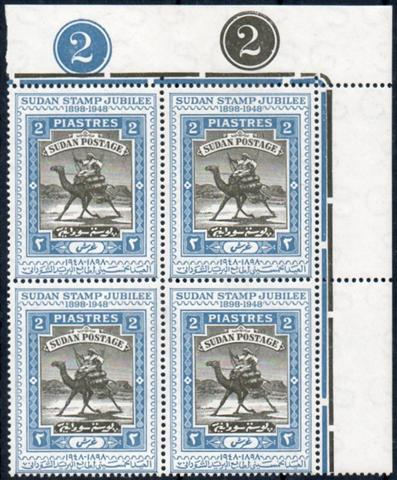
A cylinder block of the Sudan stamp jubilee issue of 1948

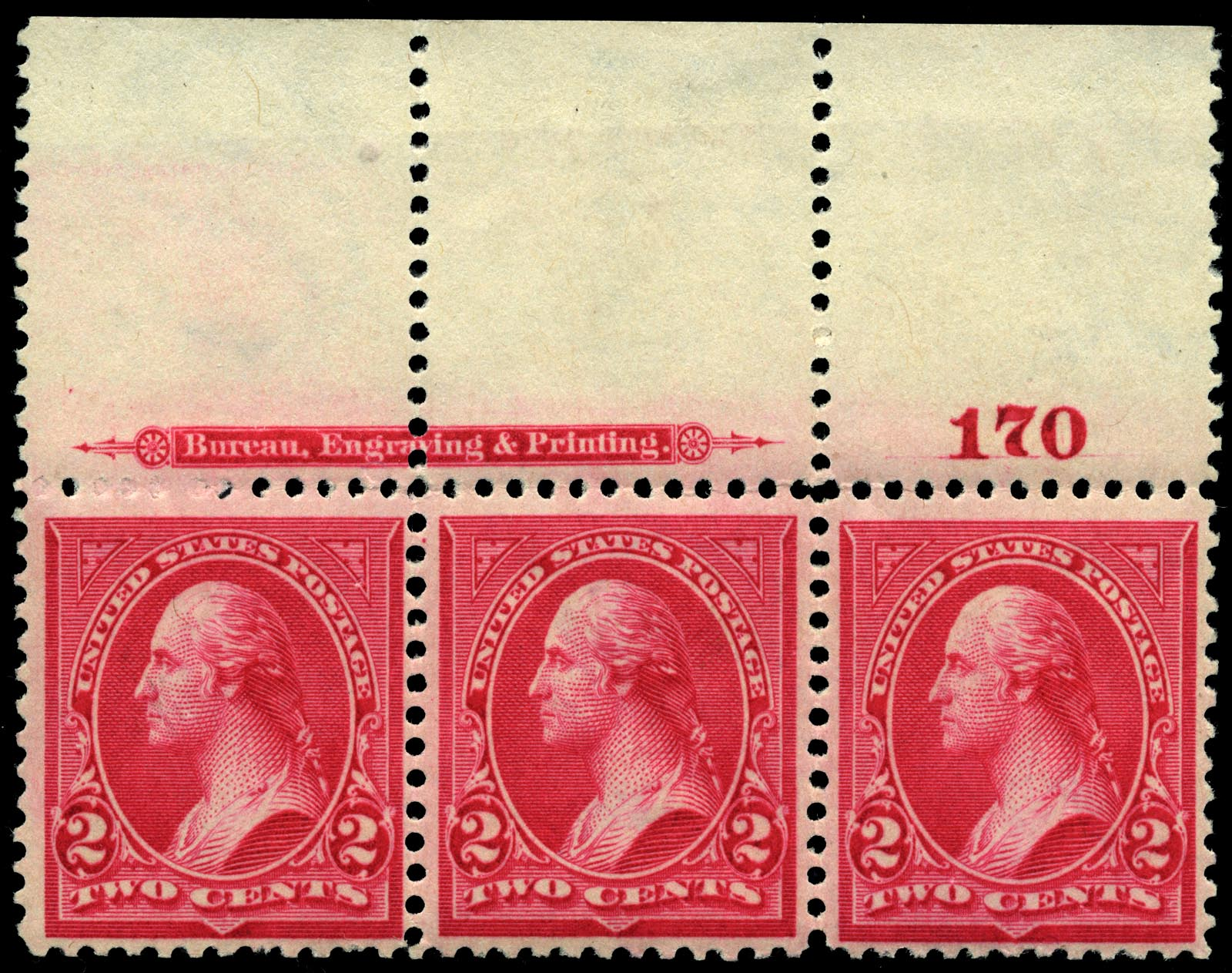
A plate strip of three of the 2-cent US stamp of 1895 includes the BEP's name.

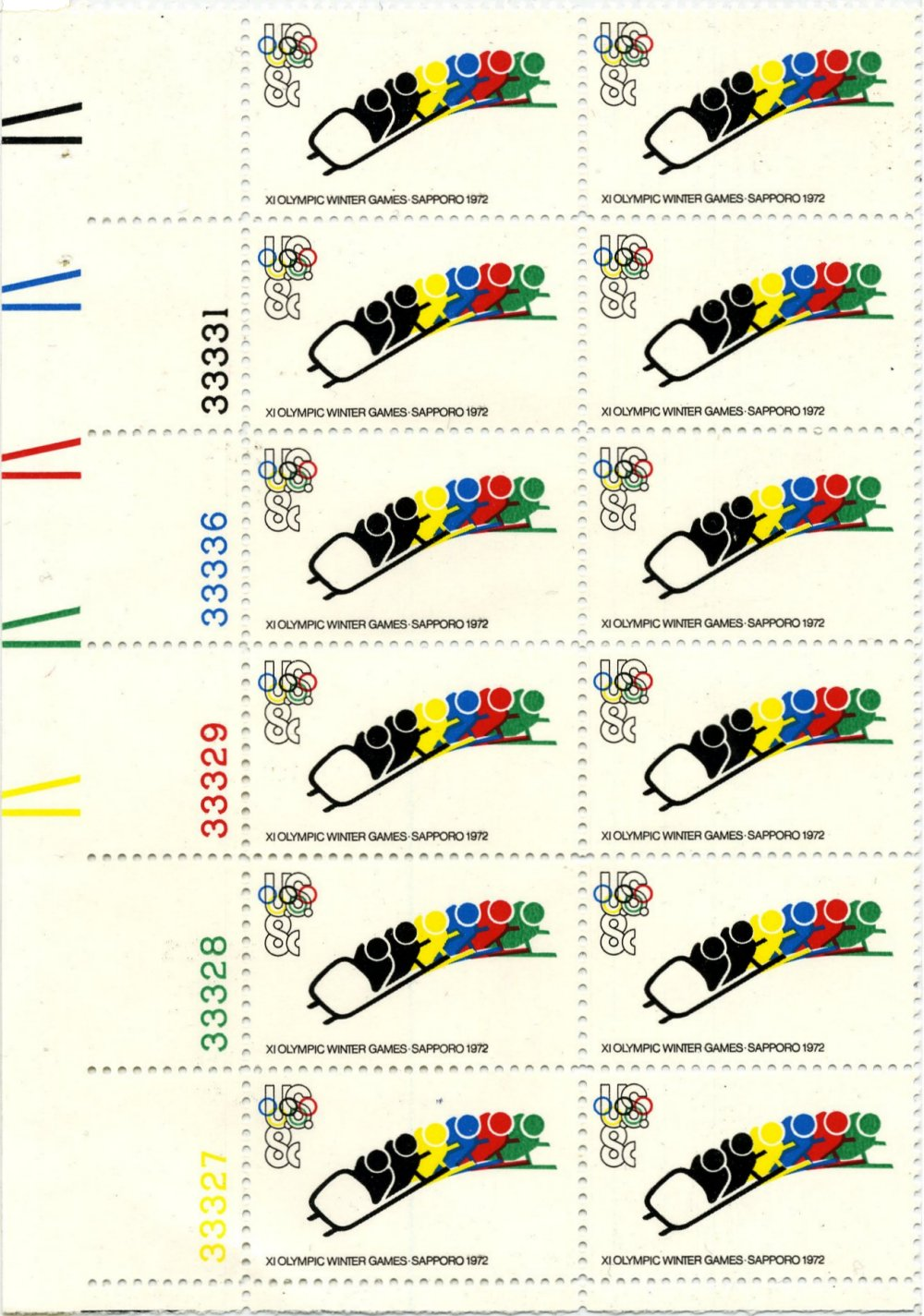
A US plate block from 1972. Note the addition of a number for each color. This increased the cost of collecting plate blocks. That, plus the format change, discouraged many collectors.

A plate block is a block of stamps from the edge of the sheet which shows the plate or cylinder from which the stamps were printed.

== Background ==
The numbering of printing plates has long been a part of quality control in the printing process. That way, if someone at the printing plant notices a problem with the printing of a certain stamp, the plate number can be used to locate the proper plate or cylinder so the problem can be investigated.

In some cases, for instance the Penny Reds of Great Britain and modern United States plate number coils, the plate numbers appear in the stamps themselves, but the more common practice is to include the number in the margin of each sheet, sometimes alongside the name of the printer.

On coil stamps (stamps issued in a long band of single stamps with the edges imperforate) a plate number sometimes is printed on the margin of a stamp, which collectors refer to as a plate number coil. Mint plate number coil stamps are most often collected as strips of three or five with the stamp with the plate number at the center of the strip.

== In the United Kingdom ==
In the U.K. plate blocks are also commonly known as cylinder blocks and are widely collected as they still form an important part of the printing process for current British stamps.

British stamps have also included a system of "controls" which were first used in February 1884 and continued until 1947. The "control" consisted of a letter in the selvedge of the sheet and was introduced as an accounting method by the printers due to the very large number of low value definitive stamps they were printing.

== In the United States ==
Until the late 1960s, United States stamps included two rows of stamps attached to one another in a block of four or more, with printing information, including the printing plate number, on attached margin paper. A number is used to identify one specific plate or cylinder used to print the stamps.

Then plate block collecting changed in the US due to the addition of up to eight multi-digit numbers which represented different colors used to print the stamps. The numbers were printed along the selvage. This meant collectors needed many more stamps to save a single plate block. This lasted for about ten years before the post office reverted to the traditional single number for most stamps. In a press release dated Dec. 10, 1980, the postal service announced a new plate numbering system that would, except in cases where more than four designs appear on a pane, "establish a plate block as consisting of four stamps regardless of the number of inks used or the press used to print the stamps." Now, new issues often begin with a number such as "11111," with each digit in a different color. Stamps printed in large quantities may have multiple plate numbers so the next plate combination might be identified as "22222" and so on.

== Collecting ==
The usual practice in plate block collecting varies by country and era; the classic 20th century US plate block consisted of a 2 x 3 block in the middle top, bottom and/or sides of the sheet for flat plate issues (a 2 x 2 block in the corner of the sheet for rotary press issues). Ambitious collectors will seek to own blocks displaying every known plate number for the stamp; specialized stamp catalogs will list these. They may also collect all of the block positions, such as the numbers of each corner that exist after a large sheet is quartered.

== See also ==
- Plating (stamps)
- Postage stamp block
