= Gutter (philately) =

Space between postage stamps

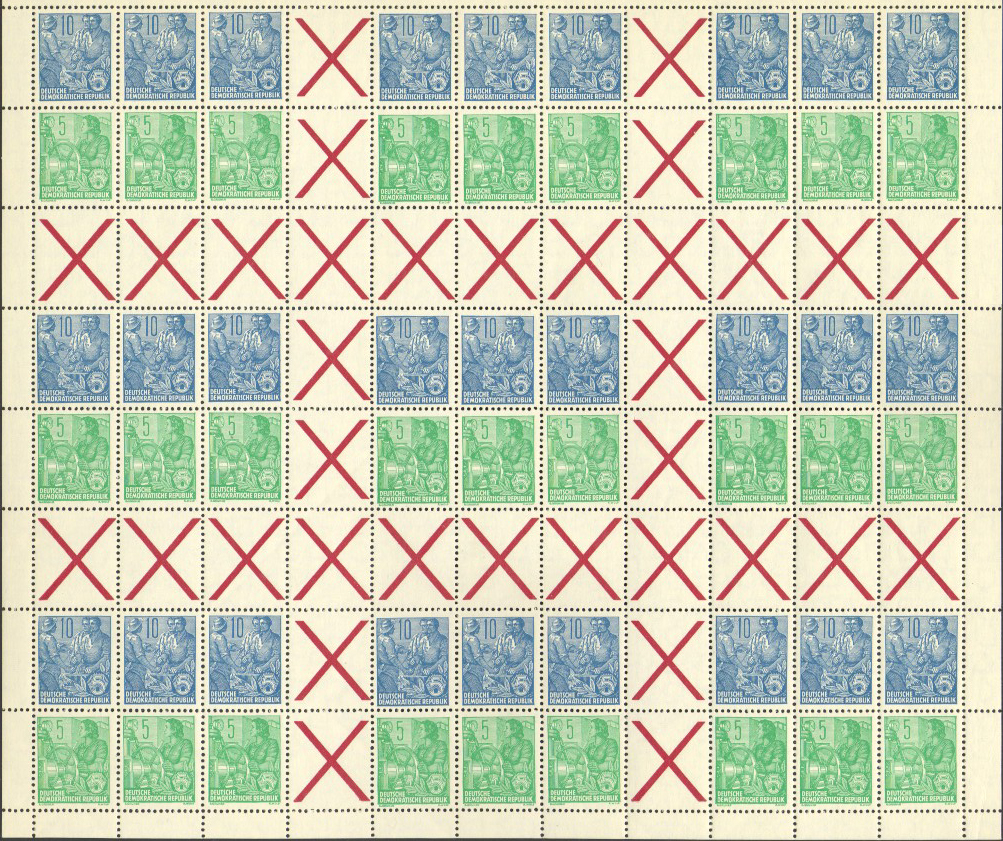
1953 DDR stamp sheet with St. Andrew's crosses printed in the gutters

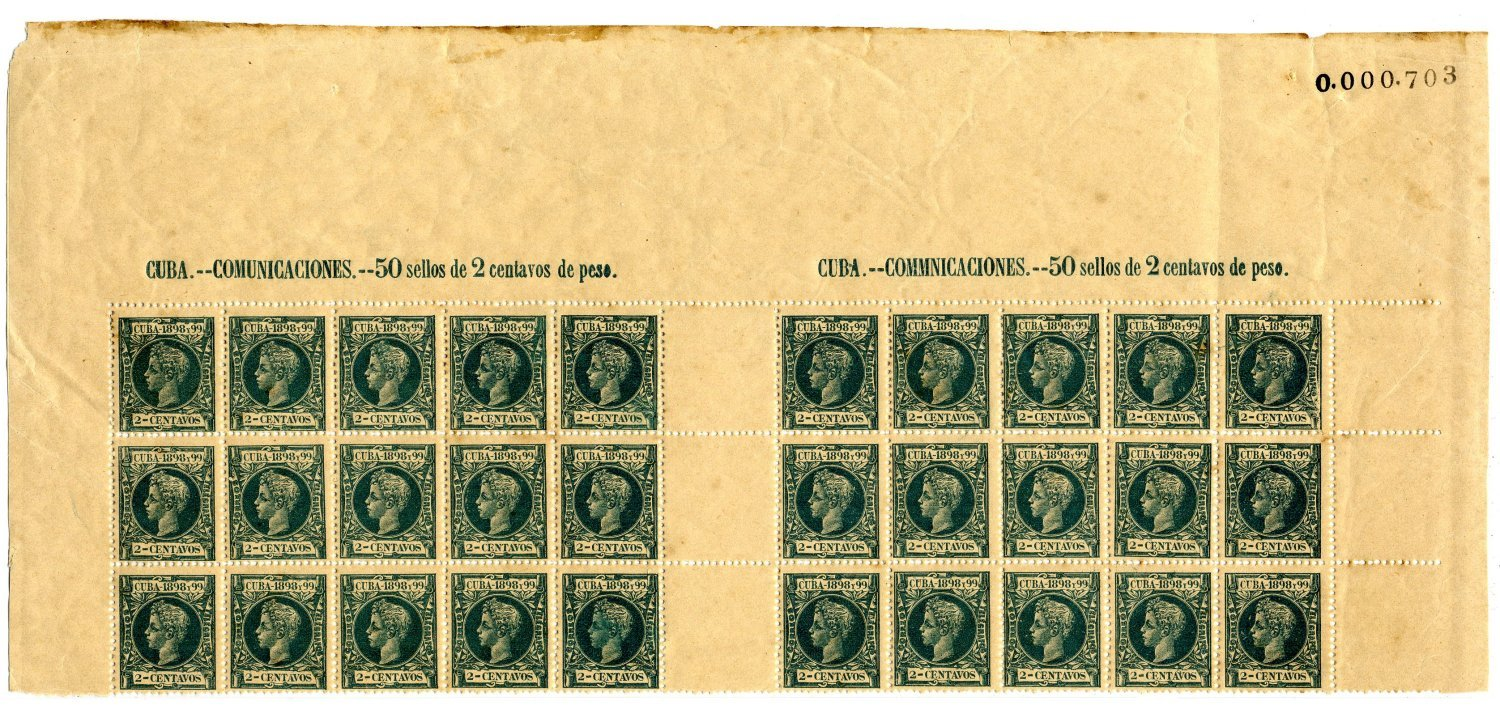
Top 30 stamps of an 1898 Cuban sheet showing a typical vertical gutter margin that divided the sheet into two panes of 50 stamps each

In philately, a gutter is the space left between postage stamps which allows them to be separated or perforated. When stamps are printed on large sheets of paper that will be guillotined into smaller sheets along the gutter it will not exist on the finished sheet of stamps. Some sheets are specifically designed where two panes of stamps are separated by a gutter still in the finished sheet and gutters may, or may not, have some printing in the gutter. Since perforation of a particular width of stamps is normal, the gutter between the stamps is often the same size as the postage stamp.

Several derivative terms exist:

- Gutter pairs are two stamps separated by a gutter.
- Gutter block is a block of at least four stamps where either the vertical or horizontal pairs, or both, are separated by a gutter.
- Gutter margin is a margin dividing a sheet of stamps into separate panes.

== See also ==
- Centro de hoja (center of the sheet) with intersecting gutters
- Label (philately)
