= Plate number coil =

A plate number coil (PNC) is a United States postage stamp with the number of the printing plate or plates printed on it. The plate number typically appears as one or more small digits in the margin at the bottom of the stamp. The plate number may be centered or, on some coil issues, located toward the right. Most plate numbers are composed of just numbers; others use a combination of letter and number. If a letter is represented in the plate number, an upper case letter usually appears at the beginning or at the end of the sequence with the former serving as a good identifier of the stamp printer.

The plate number is on one stamp out of the number of stamps printed by a single revolution of rotary printing press used to print the stamps. The interval numbers have ranged from 7 to 52.

The first coil stamp was produced in the United States with plate numbers printed on periodic stamps was the 18¢ Flag of 1981.

Collectors specializing in PNC collecting typically save plate number coils in the following formats:

1. PNC5 - Plate Number Coil 5 - A strip of 5 mint stamps with the plate number coil on the center stamp.
2. PNC3 - Plate Number Coil 3 - A strip of 3 mint stamps with the plate number coil on the center stamp. Although many collectors still collect coils in this format, a larger number of these collectors prefers the PNC5 format. As a result, a PNC3 is less desirable than a PNC5 as evidenced by many specialized stamp catalogs now assigning much higher premiums to PNC5 formats of earlier coil issues. Initially, saving PNC3s had been the practice adopted by many collectors and dealers alike and, therefore, not many early issues were saved in the longer format.
3. PNS - Plate Number Single - A single unused or used plate number coil stamp. If used, the plate number must be identifiable and not be obliterated by the postmark, although many precanceled issues, in order to show their proper use and to be collectible, should not receive any postmarks.
4. On cover - An envelope bearing a used plate number coil stamp with a contemporary postmark tying the stamp to the envelope. Many collectors prefer the cover to have the correct postage and proper stamp or stamps used for the envelope. An example of an improper use is to combine many precanceled stamps and older issues on an envelope as payment for a first class postage. Although this practice is allowed by the Post Office, most collectors find this and stamp collector contrived or philatelic covers less desirable.

Some coil issues will require collectors to save longer than even the PNC5 mentioned earlier. For example, the United States Crops coil stamps, issued in 2006, have five designs with only one of the stamp designs bearing a plate number. While some collectors will save this issue as a PNC5 and no shorter, others may choose to save it as a PNC11 so that the stamps of the same design with and without the plate number are represented.
