= Definitive postage stamps of Ireland =

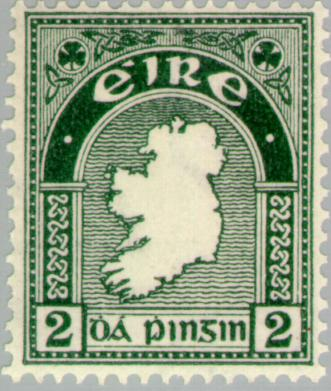
2d Map of Ireland: first Irish postage stamp

Definitive postage stamps of Ireland are the regular series of definitive postage stamps issued by the Irish Free State between 1922 and 1937 and by Republic of Ireland since 1937. Nine distinctly different series of designs have been released; additionally the watermark was changed for two issues and the currency was changed on three occasions while the designs remained the same. (Note: An Post distinguishes the different series of definitive stamps only by their design, while the Hibernian catalogue categorises each major change (watermark and currency) as a different series, Stanley Gibbons lists definitives in chronological order without any series name or distinction.)

== The stamp series ==
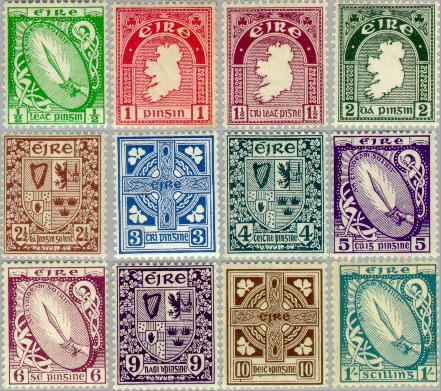
1922–23 First Definitive Series (low values)

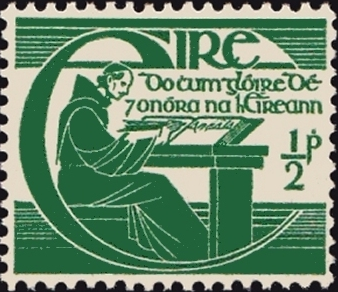
The 1944–68 1/2d stamp

=== First series ===
The first twelve stamps, the low-values up to 1 shilling, were issued during 1922–23 whilst the three high-values, 2/6, 5/- and 10/- did not appear until 8 September 1937. They were printed by typography by the Government Printers, Dublin on SE watermarked paper. The designs were: Sword of Light (4 values), Map of Ireland (3 values), Celtic Cross (2 values), Arms of the Provinces (3 values) and St. Patrick (3 high values). A small number of coils with either the horizontal or vertical edges imperf (straight) were issued between 1933 and 1935 including the rare coil in 1935.

Starting in 1940 these stamps were replaced by similar ones but printed on "gaelic e" watermarked paper. Two new values 8d (Sword of Light) and 11d (Celtic Cross) were introduced in 1949. In 1967/8 the 3d (Celtic Cross) and 5d (Sword of Light) changed to being printed in photogravure using a slightly smaller image. Two coil stamps, with imperf vertical edges were also issued.

In 1944 the 1/2d and 1s issues were replaced by the corresponding values of the set printed to commemorate the tercentenary of the death of Mícheál Ó Cléirigh designed by Richard J. King effectively becoming the definitive versions of these denominations for twenty years.

=== Gerl designs ===
Watermarked paper

Known after its German designer, Heinrich Gerl who won the 1966 international design competition, this was the first new design of Irish definitives in 31 years for the high-values and 46 years for the low-values. Sixteen stamps debuted between 1968 and 1969 on four release dates. The graphics were all based on early Irish art motifs: a dog was used in one colour for the low-values, the elk was used for the middle-value, the winged ox and eagle designs were on the high-values.

These stamps used the letter 'p' (Irish pingin) to denote pence rather than the 'd' (Latin denarius) used in the UK, so the three pence stamp bore '3p'. These stamps can be distinguished from the next issue by the presence of the letter 'p' after the numeral.

Decimal currency

1971–74 Gerl definitive stamps in decimal currency – designed by Heinrich Gerl

With the introduction of decimal currency on 15 February 1971 the Gerl designs were reused in different colours and values and released between 1971 and 1974. A total of 18 single value stamps appeared plus three different multi-value coils; one 5p value and two different 10p se-tenant strips.

Since the previous series had used the letter p to denote pre-decimal pence, the stamps in this series just used a numeral to denote the denomination, so, a three-pence stamp bore the digit 3 with no 'p' after it.

Unwatermarked paper

The last of the Gerl definitives consisted of 14 dog designs, 9 elk designs and 6 winged ox and eagle designs issued on 17 different dates between 1974 and 1980. For the first time a £1 value was put on sale. Some of the values produced were to replace different values as needed because of changing postal rates due to inflation. Unwatermarked paper, that had been introduced with the 1972 Christmas stamp, was used for the first time on definitives.

Between 1981 and 1982, six more values, printed by lithography, were issued on four different dates. A multiple coil stamp based on a se-tenant strip valued 10p also appeared.

=== Architecture ===
Line drawings by Michael Craig with graphics by P. Wildbur were used for a new series based on Irish architecture through the ages. Over six dates between 1982 and 1988 twenty-eight values were released starting with a low-value of 1p and a high-value of £5. The images depicted: Central Pavilion (Botanic Gardens, Glasnevin, Dublin), Dr Steevens' Hospital (Dublin), St. Mac Dara Church (County Galway), Aughnanure Castle (County Galway), Cormac's Chapel (Cashel, County Tipperary), St Mary's Cathedral Killarney (County Kerry), Casino at Marino (Dublin), Cahir Castle (County Tipperary) and Busáras (Dublin).

=== Heritage and treasures ===
The Irish Heritage and Treasures definitives were released between 1990 and 1995. The Michael Craig designs were printed in 22 denominations with 13 different designs comprising; 11th century silver brooch, 18th century funerary pot, 12th century hammered gold armlets, 8th century BC gold dress fastener, 12th century bronze crozier, 6th century BC bronze brooch, 1st century BC gold collar, 8th century BC gold collar, 9th century silver thistle brooch, 1st century BC beaten gold boat, 8th century BC Ardagh Chalice, 7th century Tara Brooch and 12th century Shrine of St. Patrick's Bell.

=== Birds ===
£1 goose stamp designed by Killian Mullarney

In 1997 Irish bird illustrations were used for the new issues that spanned the changes of currency from the Irish pound, through dual currency, to the introduction of the euro. Lithographically printed on unwatermarked paper by a number of different printers, the stamps were designed by Killian Mullarney. These were the first definitives where all values were printed in full colour. The initial birds illustrated are: magpie, gannet, corncrake, wood pigeon, kingfisher, lapwing, blue tit, blackbird, robin, stonechat, ringed plover, puffin, song thrush, sparrowhawk, barn owl, white-fronted goose, grey head pintail and shelduck.

These stamps were also released in several booklet and coil formats and different printings.

Irish currency

Eighteen values from 1p to £5 made up the initial set. All values, except the £1 and £5 (being nearly double size at 24 mm x 45 mm) that were printed in sheets of 50, were all sheets of 100 by ISSP, Irish Stamp Security Stamp Printing Ltd. On 2 February 1999, a miniature sheet of fifteen different 30p birds stamps debuted using many of the original birds except that new designs were used for the peregrine falcon, wren and pied wagtail.

Dual currency

On 11 June 2001, six values in dual currency (Irish & euro) appeared using birds from the previous Irish currency issue. Both Irish pound and euro values were printed on each stamp and in most cases this required the designs to be reset in a smaller form to accommodate the additional currency text. This is especially noticeable on the 30p and 32p values.

Euro currency

With the euro introduction on 2 January 2002, 17 new issues in the new single currency in values from 1c to €10 were put on sale. The €10 became the highest ever value postage stamp issued in Ireland. The initial offering used five new bird designs; chaffinch, grey heron, roseate tern, curlew and barnacle goose. Three additional values, 47c, 55c and 60c, appeared in June 2002 with new designs of kestrel, oystercatcher and jay.

An increase in postal rates resulted in two new values on 6 January 2003. Two more were released on 25 August of the same year. The 75c showed a ringed plover and the 95c depicted a sparrowhawk. The August releases were priced at 7c and 48c using the stonechat and peregrine falcon designs. As usual these were printed in sheets of 100.

The last single sheet stamps were released on 5 January 2004; in 60c and 65c denominations depicting the puffin and the song thrush.

=== Wild flowers of Ireland ===
Seven stamps, designed by the botanical artist Susan Sex, featuring flowers native to the woodlands and hedgerows of Ireland came on sale on 9 September 2004. They were; 4c dog violet, 5c dandelion, 48c primrose, 60c hawthorn, 65c bluebell, €2 lords and ladies and €5 dog rose. ISSP were the printers and as previously, the low-values were printed in sheets of 100, while the high-values (€2 and €5) appeared in sheets of 50. With another design, the 48c daisy, only available in booklets, self-adhesive booklets or self-adhesive rolls.

Five more designs were added on 12 April 2005, the 1c bloody crane's-bill, 2c Irish orchid, 7c fly orchid, 10c mountain avens and €10 spring gentian. Another five on 20 February 2006: 12c autumn gorse, 25c common knapweed, 75c navelwort, 90c viper's bugloss and €1 foxglove. With four more on 1 March 2007: 3c yellow flag, 55c large-flowered butterwort, 78c black bog-rush and the 95c purple loosestrife. And a final 3 on 3 March 2008 a 20c thrift, 50c biting stonecrop and 82c sea aster.

N Denomination

On 1 March 2007 the butterwort was reissues with an N denomination together with a new design the blue-eyed-grass, these were only available in self-adhesive booklets or self-adhesive rolls.

Stamps on a Roll

On 22 July 2010 An Post introduced Stamps on a Roll. The stamps are on rolls of 600 and are only given a denomination at the time of purchase. To distinguish these stamps from other stamp products, they are being given the name Stamps on a Roll or SOAR for short. The stamps feature four of the designs from this series: bloody crane's-bill, mountain avens, spring gentian and common knapweed.

=== Irish animals and marine life ===
On 8 September 2010, eight stamps of the seventh definitive stamp series, entitled "Irish Animals and Marine Life", were issued at launch. They photographically illustrate Ireland's biodiversity. Issued in "Stamps on a Roll" self-adhesive strips, the stamps feature the following wildlife: tompot blenny, green tiger beetle, red squirrel, golden eagle, common octopus, hermit crab, sea slug and bottlenose dolphin.

On 21 July 2011 a further eight designs were added featuring the beadlet anemone, the squat lobster, the cuckoo wrasse, the common frog, the green huntsman, the elephant hawk-moth, the goldfinch and the red deer. A third phase is scheduled for 9 August 2012 featuring green crab, raft spider, pike and the kestrel.

A 10 x 55c stamp national booklet was issued on 22 June 2011 featuring the hermit crab.

A Coil of 100 stamps, featuring 55c versions of the red squirrel and the bottlenose dolphin was issued on 29 September 2011.

=== Easter Rising centenary ===
For the centenary of the 1916 Easter Rising An Post issued an eight series of definitive stamps on 21 January 2016 that will only be on sale for a period of one year. There are sixteen stamps divided into four groups of four categories titled as: Leaders and Icons, Participants, Easter Week and The Aftermath.

Designs

Leaders and Icons illustrate photographs of seven of the rising's leaders: Thomas J. Clarke, Seán Mac Diarmada, Éamonn Ceannt, Thomas MacDonagh, Padraic Pearse, Joseph Plunkett and James Connolly plus one stamp showing the flag of the Irish Republic that flew over the General Post Office during the rising.

The Participants group depict pair of portraits of people who were involved in the fighting: Constable James O’Brien and Sean Connolly, Lieutenant Michael Malone and his brother Sergeant William Malone, Kathleen Lynn and Elizabeth O’Farrell and Jack Doyle and Tom McGrath, one of the only extant photos of rebels in the GPO.

The Easter Week stamps are the top portion of the Proclamation of the Irish Republic, Seán Foster, one of the youngest children killed, Louisa Nolan, a young woman who tended the wounded at Mount Street Bridge, Sir Francis Fletcher-Vane and the executed Francis Sheehy-Skeffington.

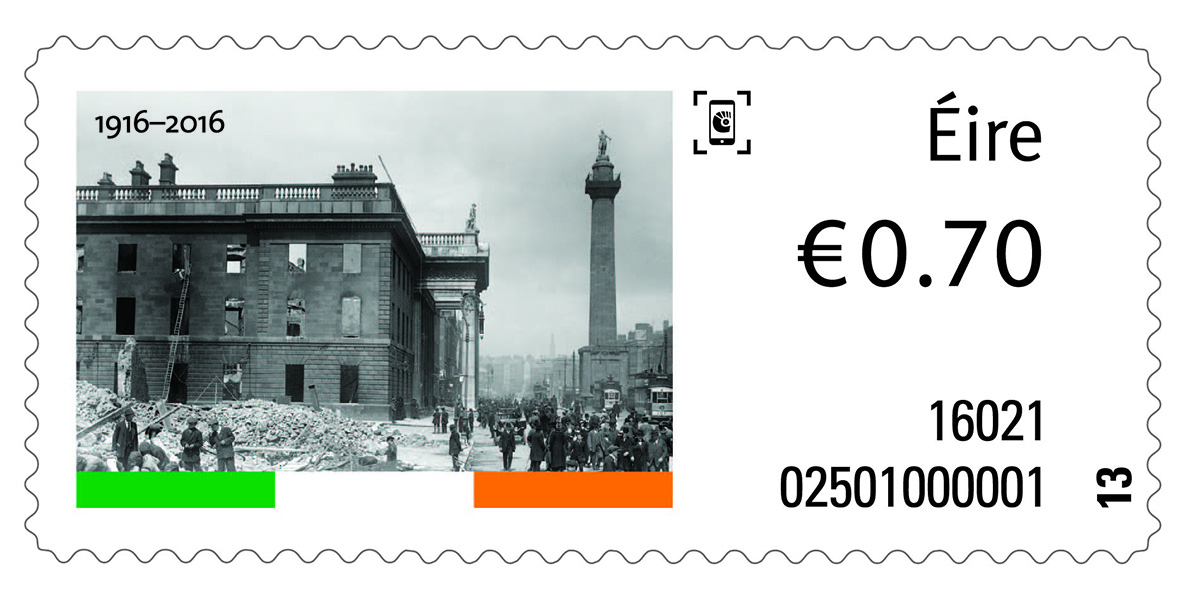
Stamp with photograph of destroyed General Post Office

The four Aftermath stamps embody the consequences portraying the destroyed GPO and the undamaged Nelson's Pillar, children with firewood, two unidentified prisoners and Roger Casement who was executed for treason.

The stamps feature an augmented reality code that allows smartphone user with internet access to the GPO Witness History website that provides background information on the Rising.

Issue formats

The basic issue come as variable value stamps in a Stamps on a Roll (SOAR) format self-adhesive labels with the pre-printed designs, the country name, and upright sequential number in the lower right corner and at the point of purchase are printed with the face value, date of purchase, a unique identifier code for each stamp including the number of the post office and the device, and operational control numbers.

Two stamp booklets of 10 narrower stamps that omit the variable value stamp machine features of the SOAR stamps have the rate printed in the picture area; the domestic rate booklet features the ruined GPO on 70¢ stamps and the foreign rate booklet shows Roger Casement on the foreign rate booklet €1.05 stamps.

All 16 designs in a different format which have the country name, 70¢ postage and augmented reality code above the image, are issued in a miniature sheet of gummed stamps.

Coil stamps in rolls of 100 70¢ self-adhesive stamps alternating the two designs of the portion of Proclamation of the Irish Republic and the flag of the Irish Republic.

=== History of Ireland in 100 Objects ===
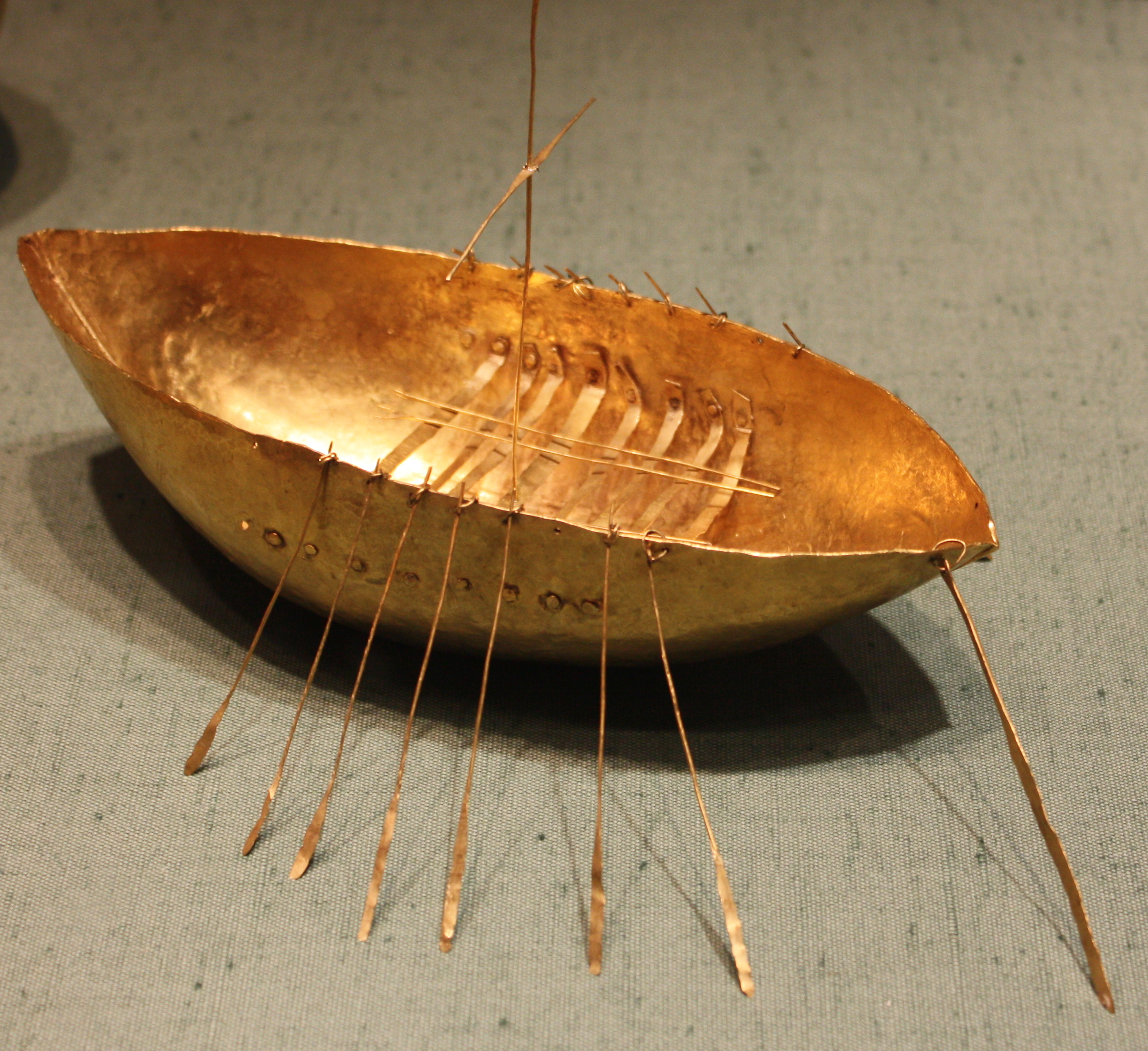
Gold Broighter boat

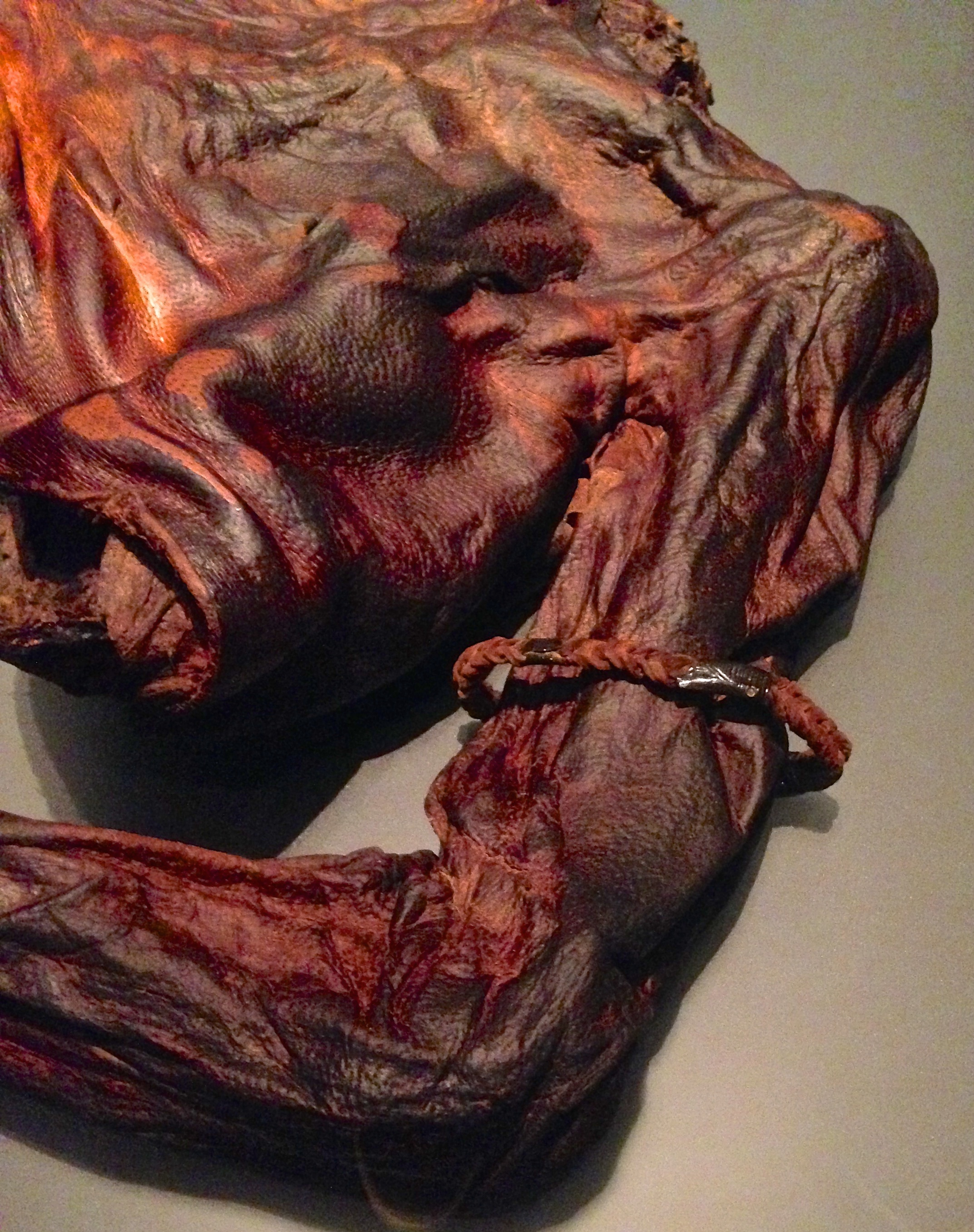
Old Croghan Man showing the armlet

Two of the "objects" from the National Museum of Ireland illustrated on the initial phase of ninth definitive series stamps

The first phase of twelve designs of the ninth definitive series were available on 13 January 2017 and are based on A History of Ireland in 100 Objects, a book by Fintan O'Toole in association with the National Museum of Ireland, the Royal Irish Academy and the Irish Times newspaper. The "objects" were defined as a single, man-made entity (not buildings), and generally freely accessible in public institutions or spaces. The complete series, being a selection of the 100 objects, are to be released over the subsequent five or six years.

The initially issued stamps were eight different SOAR stamps (Stamps on a Roll), a range coil stamps, and a domestic and a foreign rate stamp booklet that each illustrate different objects. The designs show a Mesolithic Fish Trap, Ceremonial Axehead, Flint Macehead, Bronze Age Funerary Pots, Neolithic Bowl, Tara Torcs, Coggalbeg Gold Hoard, Broighter Boat, Old Croghan Man Armlet, Pair of Gold Discs, Castlederg Bronze Cauldron and Gleninsheen gorget.

The stamps feature augmented reality that can be accessed with a smartphone app and a special website has been set up to showcase the objects where visitors can explore their historical details in Ireland's long history from circa 5,000 BC to the 21st century.

== Booklets ==
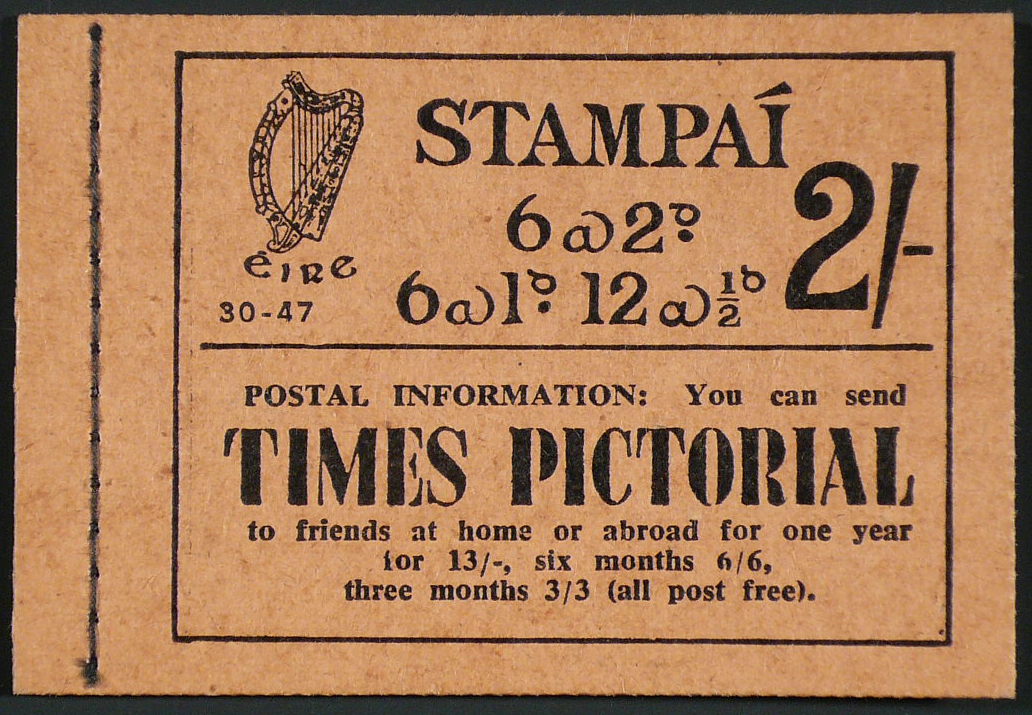
1947 stamp booklet contained 2/- worth of definitive stamps showing the serial number and year of issue 30–47 with advertising on half of the front.

Definitive stamp booklets were first put on sale on 21 August 1931. Booklet construction was a lightweight cardboard cover stitched on the left-hand side with panes of stamps (usually four panes), advertising panes and interleaving bound in. Until 1956 most booklets had half of the front cover devoted to advertising, and until 1963 booklets also had serial numbers on the front cover: two numbers indicated the year of issue and serial number (in that order on the early issues but with the order reversed for later issues), until 1963 when the serial numbers ceased. Since 1983, most booklets are no longer stitched; the stamp pane, or panes, are glued into a folded card cover.

Until 1988, when the Dublin Millennium booklet containing commemorative stamps was issued, all booklets contained only definitive stamps. Since then, An Post has issued both commemorative and definitive booklets, with three times as many commemorative booklets issued. In 1990 An Post issued the first booklet mixing definitive and commemorative stamps in one booklet and also on a single pane.

Many booklet stamps can be identified by one non-perforated edge, though a few are perforated on all edges. On booklets up to 1977, the printing plate construction enabled both upright and inverted watermarks in equal quantities owing to a gutter dividing vertical rows 6 and 7 in the sheets of 12 x 22 stamps. The gutter was used for stitching during assembly, requiring rows 4–6 and 10–12 to be turned through 180 degrees so those panes could be stitched on the left of the booklet.

== Coils ==
- The Rare 2d Coil

== See also ==
- Joint issues
- List of people on the postage stamps of Ireland
- Postage stamps of Ireland
- Timeline of postal history

== References and sources ==
Notes

Sources

- Buchalter, M. Don, ed. (1972). Hibernian Specialised Catalogue of the Postage Stamps of Ireland 1922–1972. Hibernian Stamp Co Ltd, Dublin, Ireland.
- Feldman, David (1968). Handbook of Irish Philately. David Feldman Ltd & the Dolman Press Ltd, Dublin, Ireland.
- Gibbons, Edward Stanley (2004). Stanley Gibbons Stamp Catalogue Ireland (2nd ed.). London & Ringwood: Stanley Gibbons. ISBN 0-85259-583-2.
- Hamilton-Bowen, Roy, ed. (2002). Hibernian Handbook and Catalogue of the Postage Stamps of Ireland 1922–2001. Rodgau Philatelie, Rodgau, Germany. ISBN 978-3-9807973-0-6.
- Hamilton-Bowen, Roy, ed. (2009). Hibernian Handbook and Catalogue of the Postage Stamps of Ireland 1922–2008. Rodgau Philatelie, Rodgau, Germany. ISBN 978-3-9807973-1-3.
- Jung, Otto (1992). The Irish Architecture Definitives. FAI, Forschungs- und Arbeitsgemeinschaft Irland e.V. FAI
- Miller, Liam (1983). William Kane (ed.). Postage Stamps of Ireland 1922–1982. Philatelic Section, Department of Posts and Telegraphs, Dublin, Ireland. ISBN 0-946521-01-8.
- Warren, Brian; Fitzgerald, Edward (1978). The Gerl Definitives. Ian Whyte. ISBN 0-9506415-0-2.
- Warren, Brian; Jung, Otto (2000). Irish Heritage and Treasures. FAI, Forschungs- und Arbeitsgemeinschaft Irland e.V. FAI
