= Broighter =

Broighter Irish: Brú Íochtair
- townland

Irish transcription(s)
  - Derivation: Brú Íochtair
  - Meaning: "lower fort"
- Broighter shown within Northern Ireland Broighter (the United Kingdom)
- Coordinates: 55°04′16″N 6°59′18″W
- Sovereign state: United Kingdom
- Country: Northern Ireland
- County: Londonderry
- Barony: Keenaght
- Civil parish: Tamlaght Finlagan

Government
  - Council: Causeway Coast and Glens

Area
  - Total: 150 acres (62 ha)

Broighter (Irish: Brú Íochtair, meaning 'lower fort') is a townland in west County Londonderry, Northern Ireland. It lies 4.4 miles (7 km) northwest of Limavady and 2.5 miles (4 km) northeast of Ballykelly. Broighter is part of Causeway Coast and Glens district.

The townland covers 152 acres (0.62 km^{2}) and in the 1911 census of Ireland it had six occupied houses and 20 inhabitants (9 males and 11 females).

== Broighter Hoard ==
The Broighter Hoard was discovered in 1896 by two farm labourers, Tomas Nicholl and James Morrow, who were hard at work double ploughing a field for local farmer Joseph L Gibson. The hoard includes a 7-inch-long (18 cm) gold boat, a gold torc and bowl and some other jewellery. A design from the hoard has been used as an image on the 1996 issue of the Northern Ireland British one-pound coins and the gold ship featured in a design on the last Irish one-pound coins. The Broighter Collar and Broighter Ship also featured on definitive postage stamps of Ireland from 1990 to 1995. The National Museum of Ireland, who now hold the hoard, describe the torc as the "finest example of Irish La Tène goldworking". Replicas of the collection are kept at the Ulster Museum in Belfast.

== Transport ==
Broighter railway station was opened by the Londonderry and Coleraine Railway on 29 December 1852, but closed on 3 July 1950.

== See also ==
- List of townlands in County Londonderry
