= Post & Go stamps =

Type of variable rate postage stamps

Post & Go stamps, also called Faststamps, are variable rate postage stamps printed on self-adhesive labels and sold by stamp vending machines by Royal Mail in the United Kingdom, as well as by Jersey Post, Guernsey Post, the Royal Gibraltar Post Office and Q-Post (Qatar).

First trials of a system called Weigh and Vend were run by Royal Mail and Post Office Ltd in April 2004 in three selected Post Offices. While the machines catered for a range of different mail categories, the apparent complexity and relative slowness deterred customers. Post and Go machines from three suppliers (IBM, Fujitsu, and Pitney-Bowes) trialled in 2007 in nine locations, and in 2008 these machines were replaced by Nixdorf machines, and 700 machines were rolled-out nationwide.

The first Nixdorf Post & Go machines were installed in The Galleries, Bristol, on 8 October 2008, followed by those in Sunderland and South Shields post offices on 10 October 2008.

There are two main groups of Post & Go stamps:

- Those with service inscriptions and without an explicitly imprinted value exist for a variety of postal services such as letters and postcards of the lowest weight steps to be sent First Class Mail, Second Class Mail, or Air Mail. They can be printed both on labels bearing the so-called Machin head effigy of Queen Elizabeth II, or with a field showing a pictorial design and a small silhouette of the Queen's head in the corner of the latter.
- Another group are stamps for services like heavier letters and small parcels, where the price depends on the weight. These show the type of service and the price. Originally, they only showed a security print on their left side and a "post by" date (for posting no later than the day after issue) and were not supposed to be cancelled (this in line with the usage of Horizon labels). The current Open value stamps are only printed on labels with the Machin head design, do not show a "post by" date and are treated as any other postage stamps.

Pictorial designs of Post & Go stamps of the United Kingdom include until now (2015) the Union Flag, various animals and flowers, sea travel, and heraldic beasts.

Post & Go stamps have also been issued in Jersey since 2014, and in Guernsey, Gibraltar and Qatar since 2015. Jersey has issued stamps showing the country's flag as well as a set showing protected animals, while all stamps of Guernsey and Gibraltar show their flag. The stamps of Qatar show the country's coat of arms.

Post & Go stamps with extra inscriptions have been issued on occasion of various philatelic events, and also for selected institutions.

The large number of possible combinations of service types, designs, and additional inscriptions pose challenges to collectors.

An overprint code in the lower left corner of the stamps allows to trace their origin, since the first six figures in the code correspond to the vending machine from which the stamps were sold.
