= Broighter railway station =

Northern Ireland railway station

Broighter

General information
- Location: Broighter, County Londonderry, Northern Ireland; UK
- Coordinates: 55.0730°N 6.9869°W

History
- Original company: Londonderry and Coleraine Railway
- Post-grouping: Belfast and Northern Counties Railway

Key dates
- 29 December 1852: Station opens
- 3 July 1950: Station closes
Location

Broighter railway station served Broighter in County Londonderry in Northern Ireland.

The Londonderry and Coleraine Railway opened the station on 29 December 1852.

It closed on 3 July 1950.

== Routes ==
Preceding station	Disused railways	Following station
Limavady Junction	Londonderry and Coleraine Railway; Limavady Junction to Dungiven	Limavady
