= 1935 Irish 2d coil stamp =

Rare Irish postage stamp

The Rare 2d Coil Twopence coil stamp
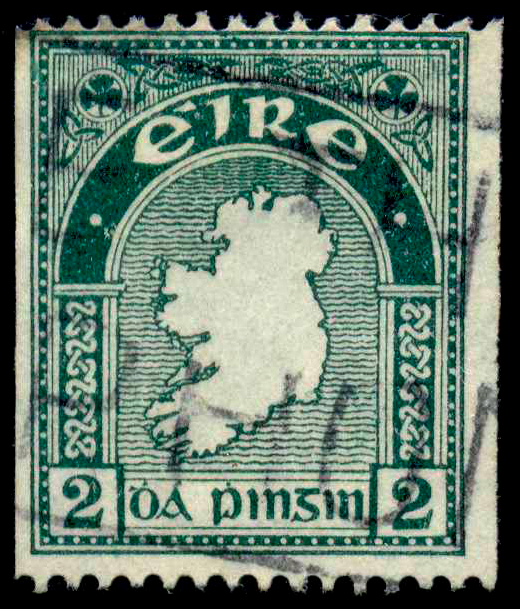
- A used example of the 2d coil stamp
- Country of production: Ireland
- Location of production: Dublin
- Date of production: 1935
- Nature of rarity: Few printed
- No. in existence: 20 mint, several used, a few on cover
- Face value: 2d
- Estimated value: GB £9,000 (mint); GB £1,500 (used)

The Rare 2d Coil was an experimental vertical coil stamp, denominated 2d, issued by the Irish Post Office in 1935 and is one of the scarcest, and most valuable, Irish stamps. It is often referred to by stamp collectors simply as "Scott 68b" or "SG 74b", being the Scott and Stanley Gibbons stamp catalogue numbers respectively.

== Design ==
Philatelists refer to the configuration as '"perf 15 x imperf", or in the US as "perf 15 horizontal", because the stamp is perforated 15 gauge (holes per 2 cm) on the horizontal and imperforate on the vertical edges. Because of the shared design it appears identical to the first 2d value definitive stamp issued on 6 December 1922 with the Map of Ireland except for the imperforate vertical edges. It uses the first Irish watermark that was a stylised design of the two overlapping letters 's' and 'e' making an 'se' watermark representing the name of the country Saorstát Éireann (Irish Free State).

== History ==
It was first recognised in 1937 but not acknowledged by the philatelic catalogues until the Scott stamp catalogue listed it in 1952. Over the years 20 copies have been identified in mint condition, but the quantity of used stamps is not known. Even though several have been recorded, they are nevertheless scarce. A few copies of the stamp are known to exist on cover, but Dulin points out that all Irish coil stamps are scarce on cover. Some debate as to the genuineness of this stamp took place in the Irish philatelic literature during the mid-1990s with a suggestion the stamp had been fabricated from a normal fully perforated stamp with a press. This hypothesis was debunked by Foley and Ian Whyte, a Dublin stamp dealer, who both claimed such a process would damage the stamp and be scientifically impossible. Archived documents were also found that confirm the stamp was ordered and issued by the Irish postal administration.

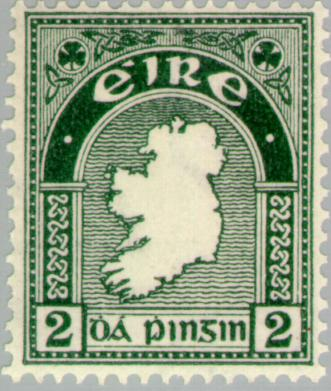
2d Map of Ireland definitive stamp perforated on all sides from a regular sheet of stamps; 1st letter rate stamp

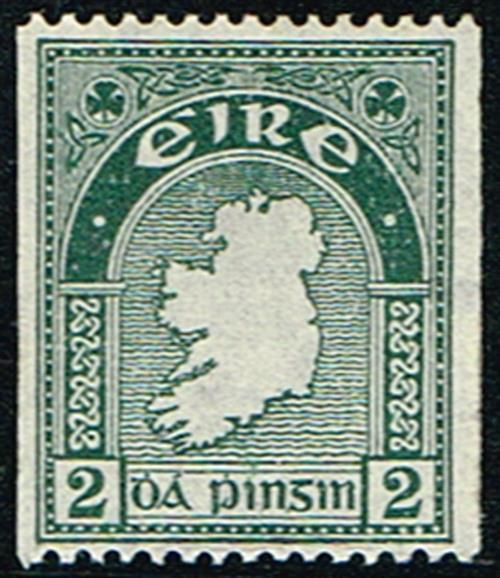
Gerard Brady example 1 sold in Dublin in May 2016 for €10,000 by Whyte's

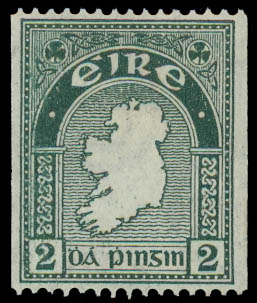
Mint 68b that received a Philatelic Foundation Certificate in 2010 was sold in an April 2011 Kelleher auction for $12,500.00 (plus 15% buyer fee)

A detailed survey of the then twenty known unused examples was carried out by Gerard Brady and published in the Irish Stamp News in 1981.

== Forgery ==
In 2004 a forgery of this stamp was reported in The Revealer, the journal of the Éire Philatelic Association, that had been found in the "Maryland forgeries" and offered for sale by a noted collector Roger West of Phoenix International. The forgery is paler than the genuine stamp and the print is coarser, on a white ungummed paper and perforated 10.75 x imperf. The printed stamp area is 18.0mm x 22.5mm compared to 18.5mm x 22.0mm on the original.

== See also ==
- Postage stamps of Ireland
- Definitive postage stamps of Ireland

== References and sources ==
Notes

Sources

- Bugg, Peter E. (1996). The First 55 Years of Irish Coils. Éire Philatelic Association, USA.
- Feldman, David (1968). Handbook of Irish Philately. Dublin, Ireland: David Feldman Ltd & the Dolman Press Ltd.
- Foley, Joseph E. (1995). The Rare Coil. Joseph E. Foley, USA. (Past-President American Philatelic Society )
- Stanley Gibbons (2004). Stanley Gibbons Stamp Catalogue: Ireland, 2nd Edition. London: Stanley Gibbons Ltd. ISBN 0-85259-583-2.
