= Broighter Gold =

Gold artefacts from the Iron Age

Broighter Hoard
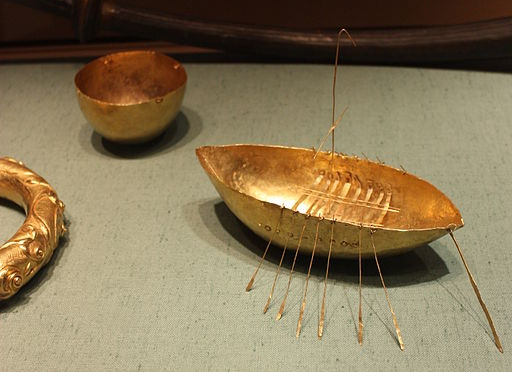
- The boat, bowl, and part of the torc
- Material: Gold
- Period/culture: 1st century BC
- Discovered: 1896, near Limavady, Ireland, by Tom Nicholl and James Morrow
- Present location: National Museum of Ireland

The Broighter Gold or more correctly, the Broighter Hoard, is a hoard of gold artefacts from the Iron Age of the 1st century BC that were found in 1896 by Tom Nicholl and James Morrow on farmland near Limavady, Northern Ireland. The hoard includes a 7-inch-long (18 cm) gold boat, a gold torc and bowl and some other jewellery.

The National Museum of Ireland, who now hold the hoard, describe the torc as the "finest example of Irish La Tène goldworking". Replicas of the collection are kept at the Ulster Museum in Belfast.

A somewhat puzzling aspect of the hoard is that scientific analysis suggests the same source for the gold in all the pieces, but they show a great diversity in style, from Celtic to Roman.

A design from the hoard has been used as an image on the 1996 issue of the Northern Ireland British one-pound coins and the gold ship featured in a design on the last Irish commemorative one-pound coins. The Broighter Collar and Broighter Ship also featured on definitive postage stamps of Ireland from 1990 to 1995.

== Discovery ==
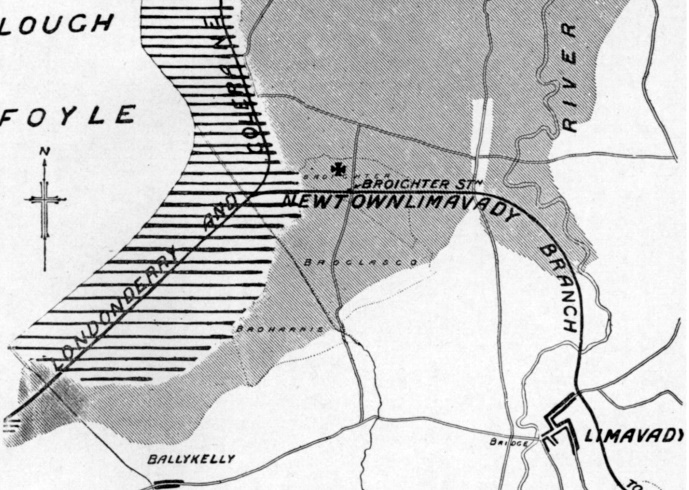
The location of the find – the horizontally hashed areas show an area of reclaimed land which was previously part of Lough Foyle.

The hoard was found near Lough Foyle in a field in the townland of Broighter (Irish: Brú Íochtair, meaning 'lower fort') 2 km northwest of Limavady in County Londonderry. It was discovered by Thomas Nicholl and James Morrow while working as ploughmen for Joseph L. Gibson in February 1896. They found the hoard whilst double ploughing. That means that one plough would follow the other to gain extra depth. It was estimated that the finds were buried 14 inches (36 cm) deep and were in close proximity to each other.

The find was taken to the farm where Maggie (later Mrs Nicholl) washed the items in a sink. At that time they did not realise they were made from gold. The hoard was eventually sold to the British Museum for six hundred pounds. It consisted of a miniature ship, complete with fittings and oars; two necklets, a bowl and a torc (or hollow collar). The find was described as a lump of mud when initially shown. Moreover, the boat had been so badly damaged by the plough that it took a goldsmith to later work out its structure.

Part of the boat, a thwart, was found a few days later and sold by Morrow's sister to a jeweller in Derry.

== The finds ==
The hoard's gold shares metallurgical characteristics, despite the diverse styles of the pieces. Some appear to be imported, while others may be reworked or entirely remade. One possibility is that a group of pieces made in the Roman Rhineland reached Ireland, perhaps after a period in Britain, where some pieces were remade, and the necklaces left as they were.

=== The boat ===
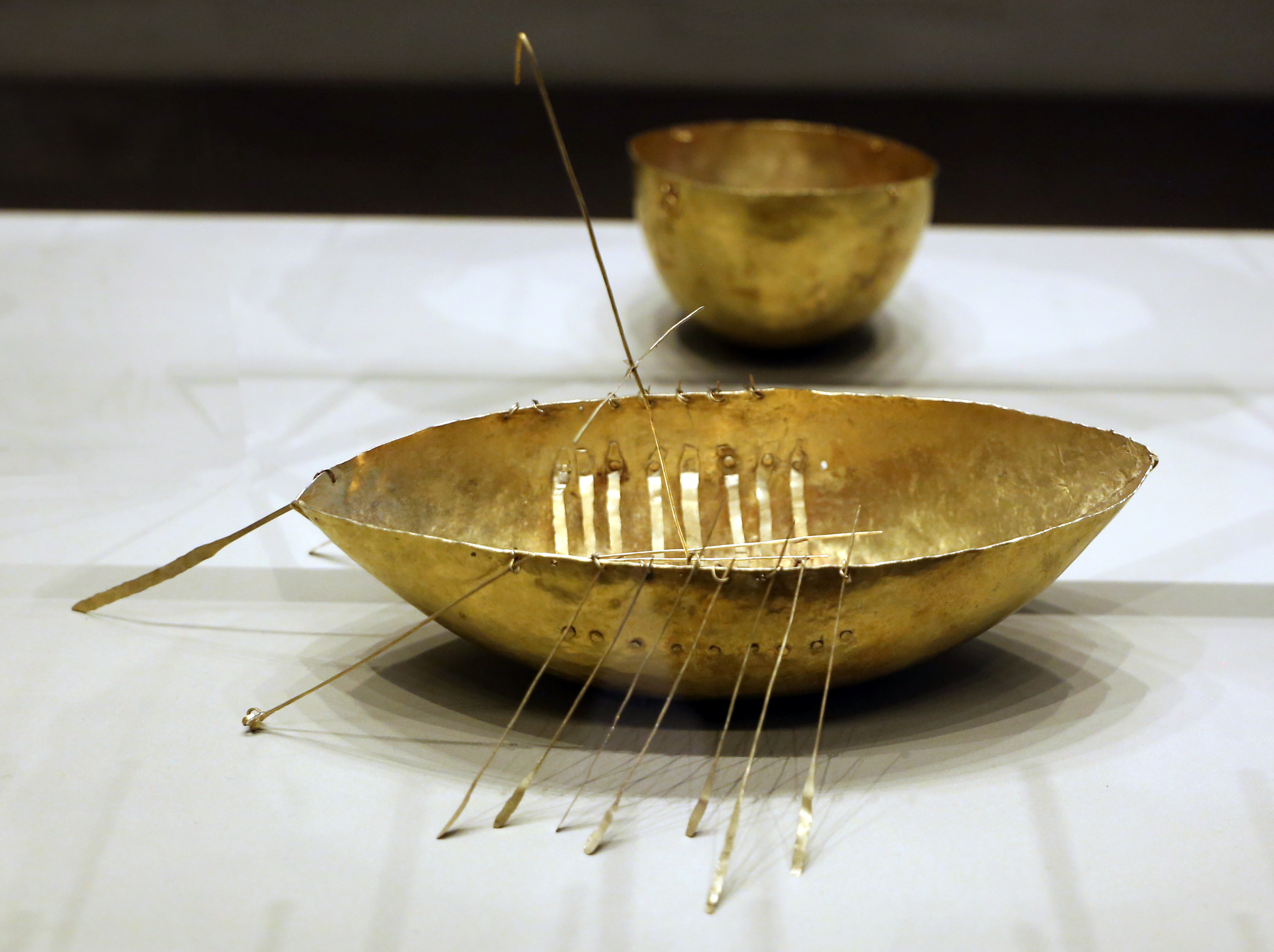
The boat

The boat measures 7.25 inches (18.4 cm) by 3 inches (7.6 cm) and weighs 3 ounces (85 g). It had benches, rowlocks, two rows of nine oars and a paddle rudder for steering. It also included tools for grappling, three forks, a yardarm, and a spear. The tools are of much lighter design than the ship's hull and are shown in the illustration. The boat has led some archaeologists to suggest that the hoard was a votive deposit, perhaps to the Celtic sea god Manannán mac Lir. Other scholars dispute this identification, however; noting that all extant stories in which Manannán appears are later medieval compositions and there is no indication that the Irish of the 1st century BC would have worshipped him.

=== The torc ===
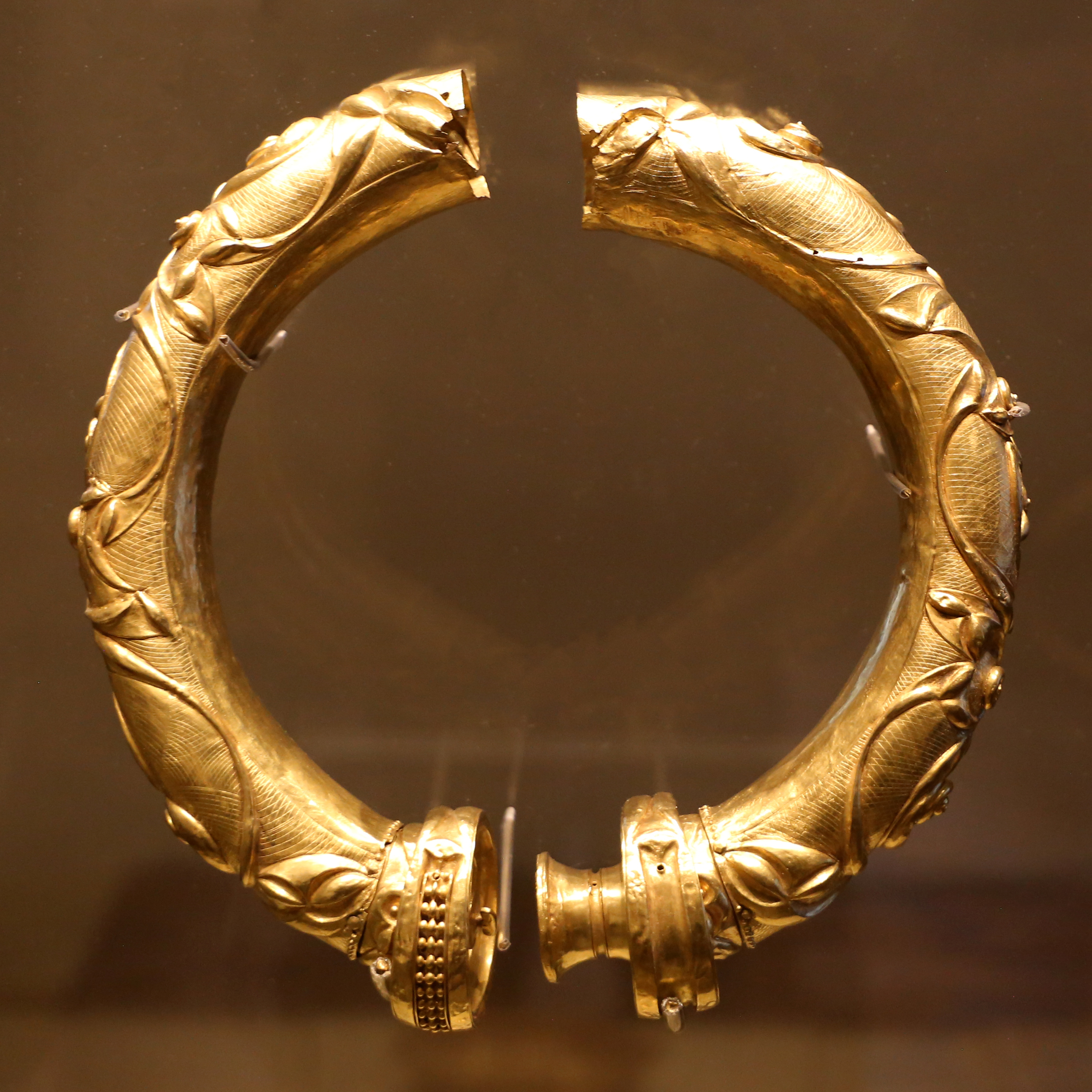
The Torc

The other remarkable item was the torc or collar which is 7.5 inches (19 cm) in diameter with buffer terminals, using a mortice and tenon fastening. The hollow tube that made up the ring is 1.125 inches (2.86 cm) in diameter. The hinge is no longer there but it would have been required to put on the collar. The fastening consists of a "T" piece which fits into a slot as the torc is closed. A section can then be turned which captures the "T" and prevents it opening.

The design has been applied in three ways, the most common is where the classical designs of generic plants has been revealed by beating back the surrounding gold. Other areas have additional pieces attached and the background has been incised in geometric curves to add to the decoration.

There are no comparable La Tène style hollow torcs known from Ireland, although somewhat similar examples such as the Snettisham Torc are known from Britain in this period. The design on the torc can be studied easily by imagining the hollow tube as straightened and flattened. This was done in the first study of the hoard by Arthur Evans and his drawing can be seen here. The design matches other Irish pieces, and may have been a remodelling of a plainer British or Rhineland torc (the Rhineland is one possible source of the gold).

=== Bowl ===
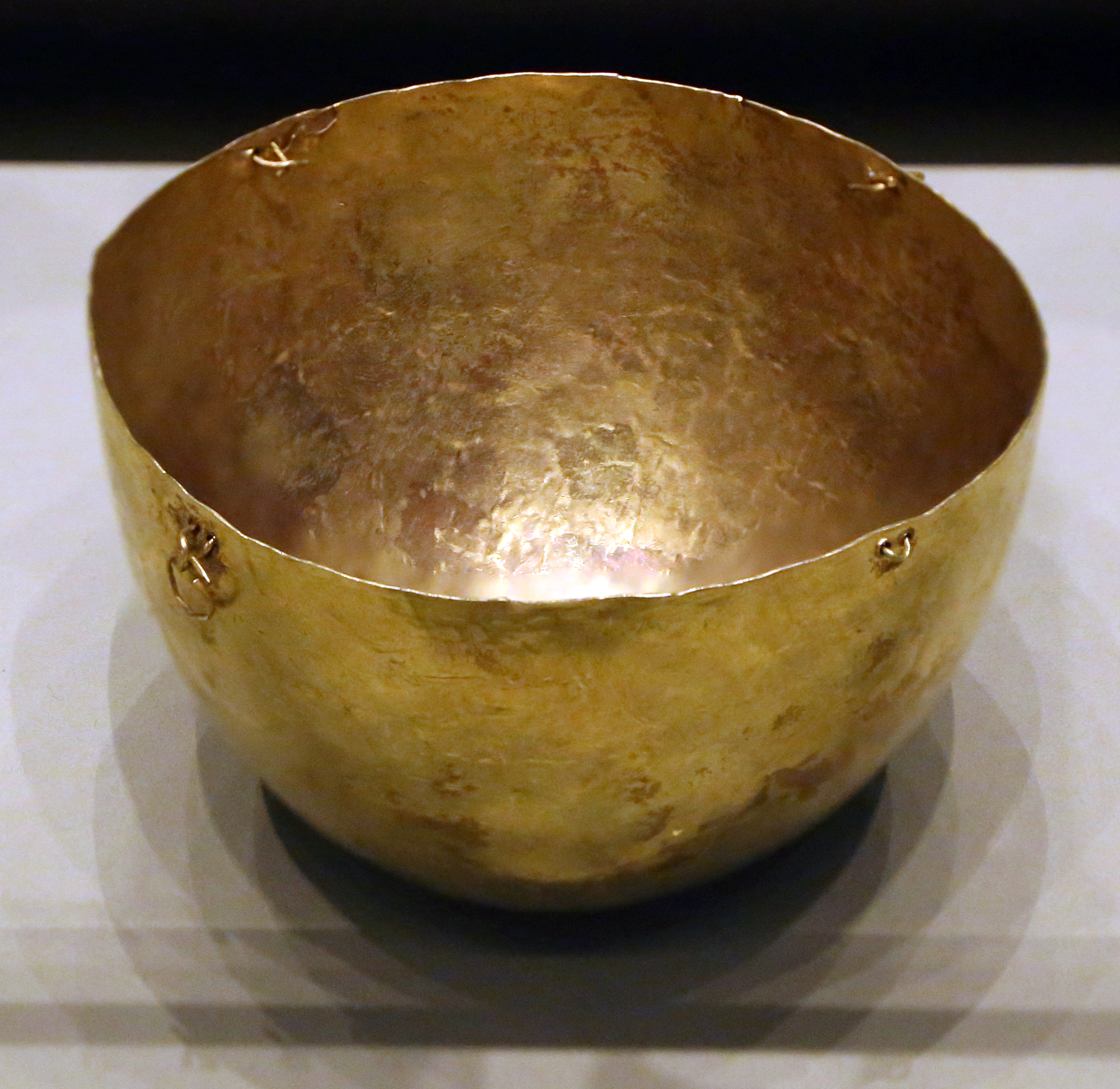
The bowl

An unusual gold bowl or model cauldron which was made from a single sheet of gold was discovered. Its purpose is unclear but it was probably a model of a large cauldron, which was an important object in the feasting culture of Iron Age Europe. It had four suspension loops on the outside, not all surviving. It is 3.5 inches (8.9 cm) in diameter and is about 2 inches (5.1 cm) deep. It weighs over 1 ounce (28 g). Hanging bowls were later to be a distinctive feature of post-Roman British and Irish art, often thought to be a speciality of Celtic areas.

=== Chain necklaces ===
There are two chain necklaces, using loop-in-loop technique, with clasps. One is 39.6 cm long, with triple chains, the other with a single chain but of more complicated construction. The chain technique spread from the Middle East to the Roman world, where these were probably made; the clasps match Roman and Etruscan examples.

=== Bar torcs ===
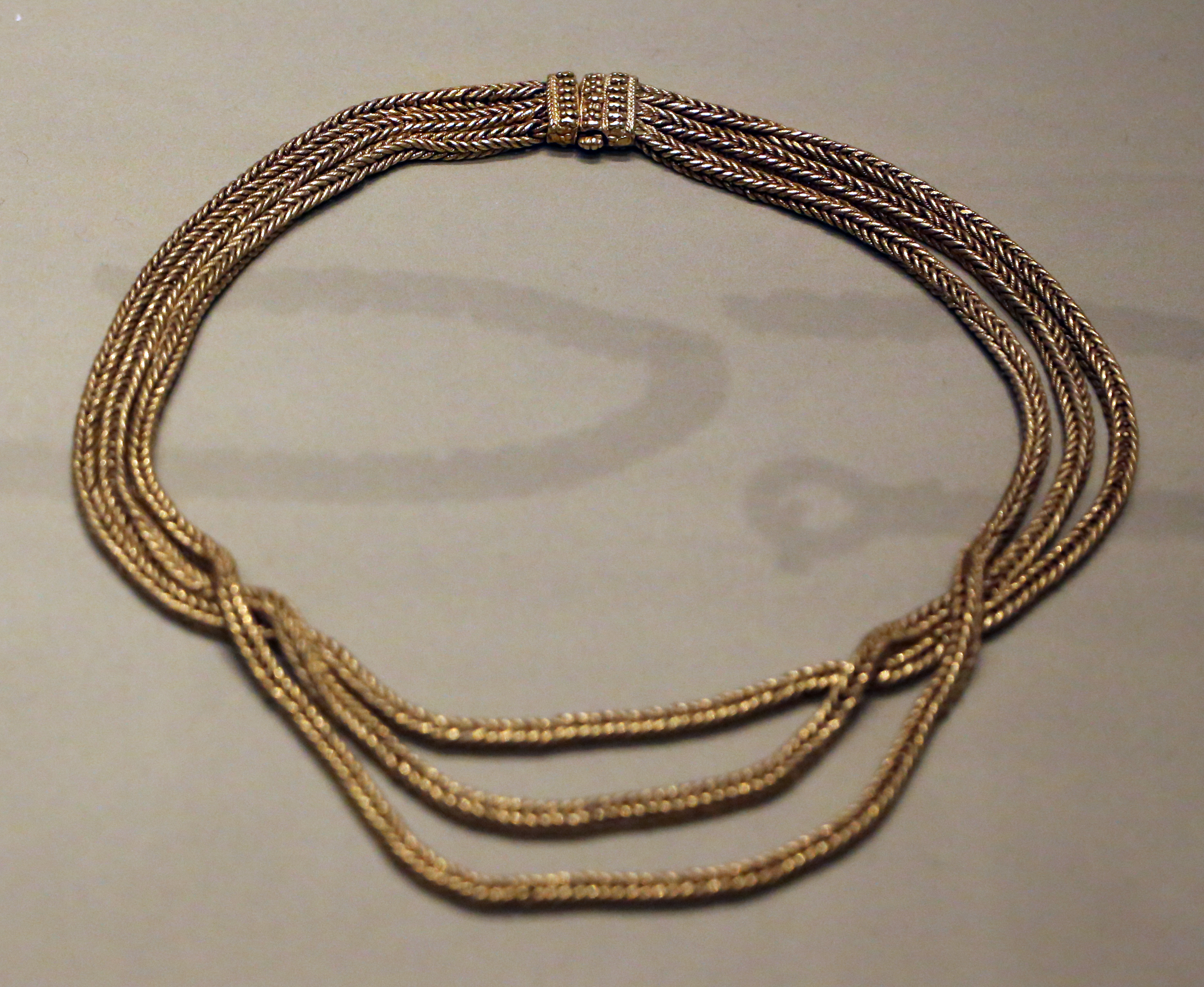
The triple chain necklace

There are also two torcs made from single twisted bars of gold, a British style. One is complete, with a diameter of 18.6 cm, the other a semi-circular fragment. Despite unusual hook-in-loop fastenings and other features, these are probably imports from what is now south-eastern England. The Stirling torcs from Scotland include two twisted "ribbon" torcs.

== Ownership ==
The hoard was sold by the farmer, J.L.Gibson, to a jeweller in Derry who sold it to a local antiquarian, Robert Day. He sold it to the British Museum for £600. The museum had undisturbed ownership until the renowned Arthur Evans wrote a paper describing the find in 1897. The drawing of the torc design comes from this paper. The Royal Irish Academy disputed the British Museum's view that it was an ancient gift to the gods and launched a long running court case. The academy wanted the finds to be declared treasure trove, that is, buried with the intention of recovery. Day, the antiquarian, was so aggrieved to have his sale disputed that he withdrew a gift he was going to make to the Irish Academy.

It was argued that the model of the boat and the "sea-horse image" on the torc when combined with the finding of nearby shells showed that the treasure had been placed in water deliberately as an offering to ancient gods. The map above shows how close the find was both to the sea and to reclaimed land where the railway then travelled. The British Museum's position was set out by Evans who had described the find as votive in his 1897 paper – ironically something the academy's successor, the National Museum of Ireland, now consider likely, saying on their website: "The objects may have been buried as an offering to a Celtic god, presumably during the first Century BC".

The dispute was finally settled by a court in London in 1903 in an important case where the government was represented by Sir Edward Carson, who was a Unionist and Solicitor-General. A pivotal issue in the case was that the finds were all closely packed which was indicative of burial. It was held that the treasure was not a religious offering and was therefore forfeit to the crown. The treasure was taken to Dublin and placed in the museum there. Although some have suggested that the gold should be transferred to nearer their find-spot in what is now Northern Ireland, the items remain in the National Museum of Ireland in Dublin.

== Importance ==
The hoard is considered an important find. The National Museum of Ireland believes that the collar is the "finest example of Irish La Tène goldworking". The eclecticism of the styles is comparable to that of the objects in the Stirling Hoard from Scotland, probably from a slightly earlier period. The torc was incorporated into a 1996 design for a British pound by Norman Sillman and the boat was used as a basis for the design for the last pound coin ever issued by the Irish Mint. This coin was issued to celebrate the millennium in 2000.

== See also ==
- List of hoards in Ireland
- The Caergwrle Bowl, a miniature boat in shale with tin and gold, found at Caergwrle in Wales, in 1823
- Ardagh Hoard
