= Stamp vending machines in the United Kingdom =

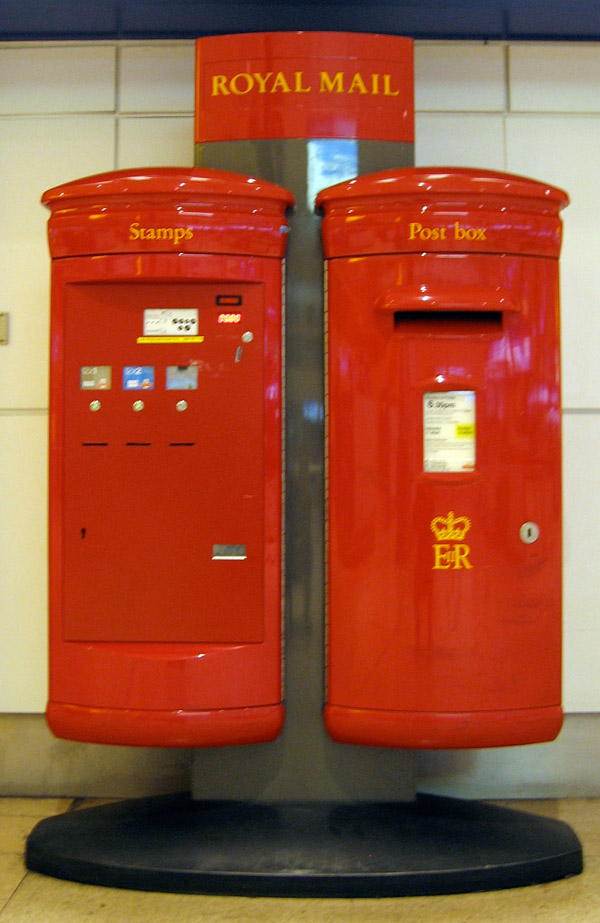
Stamp vending machine in the London Heathrow Airport

A stamp vending machine (SVM) is a mechanical, electrical or electro-mechanical device which can be used to automatically vend postage stamps to users in exchange for a pre-determined amount of money, normally in coin. Most SVMs were positioned in public places to provide a useful service to customers when other sources of postage stamps, such as Post Offices were closed. The term is often applied to the entire object as found attached to a pillar box or sited in a wall. The name Stamp Vending Machine only applies to the internal mechanism, the housing is described by the UK Post Office as a "case" and was supplied, installed and maintained separately. Many postal administrations around the world have used automatic stamp vending machines including the United States, where private manufacturers began vending stamps from coils in 1908. Most countries of the Commonwealth of Nations have issued stamps for use in Stamp Vending Machines, including Hong Kong, New Zealand and Malta.

Many countries still use stamp vending machines; for instance, in Europe, France and Germany do. Their design, fairly modern, is similar to the kind of electronic interface you may find on a machine selling train tickets, or an ATM: a screen displays several buying options, possibly in different languages. A set of buttons on both sides of the screen allows to select the desired option. The process can involve several steps (i.e. first choosing the value of the desired stamps, then their number). These machines normally accept coins, and in France also debit cards. The French machine, located in post offices, can let the user weight the envelope so that the exact correct fare may be selected (depending on the destination country). The German machines, located either inside or outside post offices, don't feature a scale, but the user can type the value they want to see printed on the stamp, before selecting how many they want. The German machine doesn't give change in coins, but issues extra stamps with the remaining value. The French machines, however, do give exact change. In Australia, modern stamp vending machines are regular vending machines (the same types as snack machines) which issue bulk stamp packs (which are standard issue stamps rather than separate vending machine issues) as well as bulk parcel satchels; individual stamps or parcels are not available and only credit cards are accepted for payment due to the high costs of these items.

== Stamp vending machines in the United Kingdom ==
=== Early designs ===
In the UK, the earliest SVM was tested in the last years of the 19th century, but there are no drawings or records appertaining to it, and it was quickly withdrawn. The earliest production series machines were introduced under Edward VII in 1907 following experiments with a patented 1906 design by New Zealander Robert J Dickie which was demonstrated to the British House of Lords in 1907. Dickie licensed the sales rights to his new machine outside the British Empire to Kermode & Co, who successfully sold it around the world. SVM mechanisms and cases are described by the UK Post Office using, rather confusingly, two separate alphabetical series of type letters to describe each one. Thus a machine may be described in the format of a "Type B4 mechanism in a Case Type K".

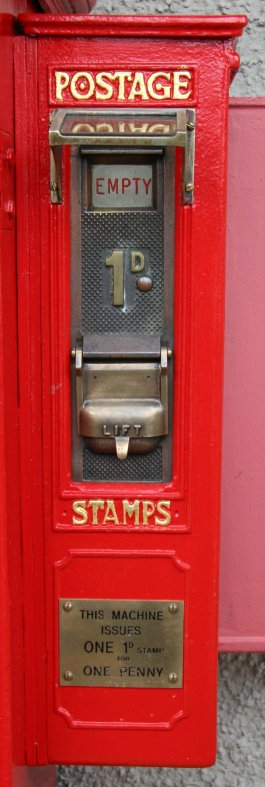
An early Type A mechanism on display at the Inkpen Post Box Museum Taunton, Somerset

The earliest 'A' type vending machine was completely mechanical, deriving power to drive the vending mechanism from the insertion of a suitable coin. Initially the machines were set to dispense only ½d and 1d stamps. These proved to be quite successful and were in continuous production until 1924, when the improved Type 'B' machine was introduced. Type A machines feature elaborate cast brass fronts with the coin value raised against a chequer-plate design in the casting. Type 'B' could accept ½ d, 1d or (later) 3d coins and would in exchange, vend a single stamp from a coil stamp roll joined vertically (IE head-to-tail). A number after the letter B denotes a particular pattern or variation in design for the machine. The coin value is indicated on a changeable metal plate near the coin slot as the value and coin size were now variable at the time of manufacture, but not once deployed in the field.

The K4 (or Kiosk No. 4) design of the classic British red telephone box, introduced in 1925, incorporated a stamp vending machine. Five of the original fifty K4s remain standing today and was described as an "automated mini-Post Office".

=== New types introduced ===
Following quickly from the Type’B' designs came other combinations of coin-operated machine. In Type 'C', two ½d stamps were issued in exchange for one penny coin, whilst in Type 'D', one 2d stamp is vended in exchange for two penny coins. These four types all work with long continuous stamp coils. In Type 'F', the machine is set to dispense booklets of stamps. These were introduced for machine-vending shortly before the outbreak of World War II and eventually came to be the predominant type in use. Booklets were first tried out in 1935 as mixed-value booklets of King George V Jubilee stamps in panes of four, interleaved with advertising. These Jubilee books were too large for machine vending at the time.

=== Heyday of the stamp vending machine ===
By 1970, there were about 50,000 stamp selling machines being used in the UK and many more had been exported worldwide. The basic design remained unchanged from 1905 until 1970, when the Type 'G' series was introduced. G.1 was the first "modern" mechanism and was said by the manufacturer to be designed to fit in the old housings, although subsequent to the prototype it had to be modified and in any case was much deeper than the preceding designs so that it actually required its own specially designed case, designated Type U. Type G machines incorporated many novel features including a Perspex cover sealed from moisture over the stamp coil to prevent the stamps sticking together. In addition the mechanism was driven by the user lifting a large flap over the vend slot. This action primed the machine. It could be set to dispense any number of stamps from one to five against the insertion of a single coin, although in practice this was never done and all Type G machines vended a strip of five values. Initially these added up to 1 shilling, then after 1971, 5 new pence and by 1980, 10p. Changes in postal rates introduced in 1980 meant that all surviving 10p machines were withdrawn from service.

=== Construction and use ===
Types A-E share the same common features that contributed to their success; they all have a stamp feed wheel with pins which accurately interlock with the stamp perforations and they all derive the energy needed to operate the mechanism from the raising of a weight through the insertion of a coin. Type F machines are different in that the coin releases a "Pull" bar which when pulled, forces the next booklet in a stack out through the vend slot. Such mechanisms as Type F and Type G are said to be "coin-freed". This proved to be very successful and was used over and over again in subsequent designs of machine up to about 1988, when manufacture of purely mechanical SVMs ceased.

From that time all machines in use in the UK were of the electro-mechanical type. This used a standard mechanical coin-weigher unit and mechanical stacking for booklets, but had an electronic arm on a rotating cam for dispensing the booklets. They were manufactured by Hillday Automation of Attleborough, Norfolk and designated Type B52. Two versions were built with either long or short coin boxes, easily recognised from the length of the case. Initially set to dispense 4 x 25p stamps in a folded booklet in exchange for a £1 coin, different combinations were later employed as postage rates in the UK continued to rise.

These electro-mechanical machines were powered by large internal battery packs which made them expensive to service and more unreliable than the purely mechanical designs. All of these were removed during 2001 and today there are far fewer automated stamp vending machines in use in the UK. As stamp booklets can now be widely purchased from supermarkets, garages, kiosks and newsagents, demand for automatic vending facilities has declined to the point where their continued operation becomes un-economic. Remaining machines are also found inside Post Offices, dispensing 1st and 2nd class NVI stamps from coils for those customers who wish to avoid queues.

=== Official documents ===
In 1949, the GPO were issuing Type B4 machines in 1/2d and 1d denominations, while by 1958 a B4 3d machine had been introduced. P.O. Engineering Dept. notice C.1003 was issued on 22 September 1949, which includes ink drawings to show how the B4 mechanism works. Notice C4111 details how to load it, while maintenance is covered by C5011 & C5164. These documents can be viewed at The British Postal Museum & Archive in London.

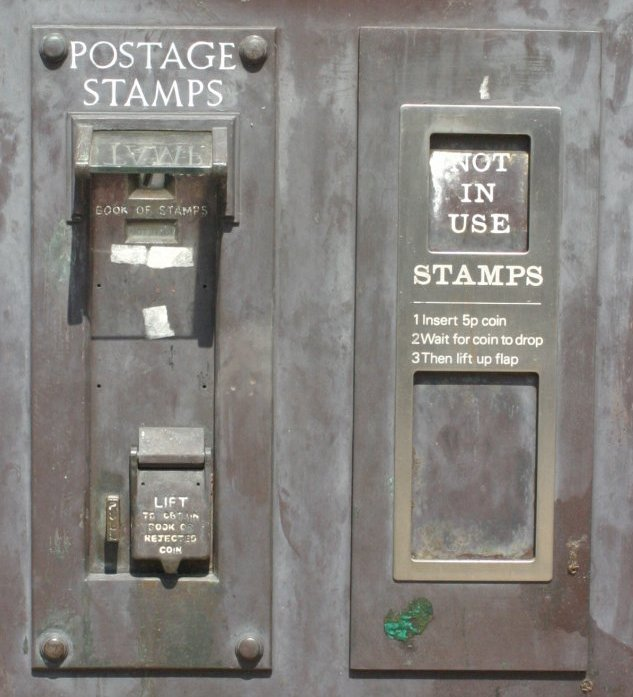
Attleborough, Norfolk, PO showing a Type F booklet mech and a plated-over housing for a Type G multi-value coil mechanism

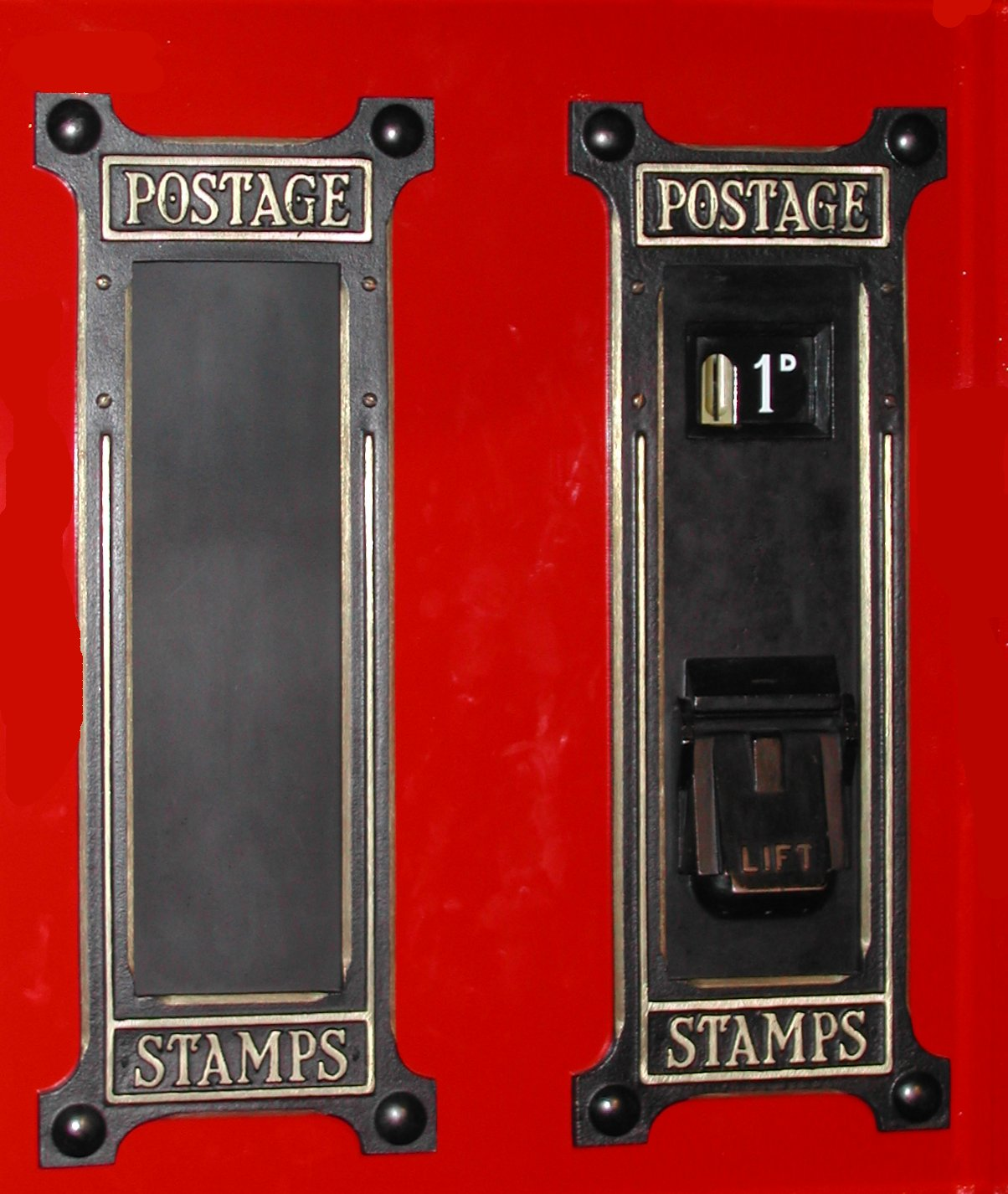
A nice pair of Type E wall mounting plates (without hoods) and a B1 1d mechanism in the side of GPO2 the BPMA Mobile Post Office

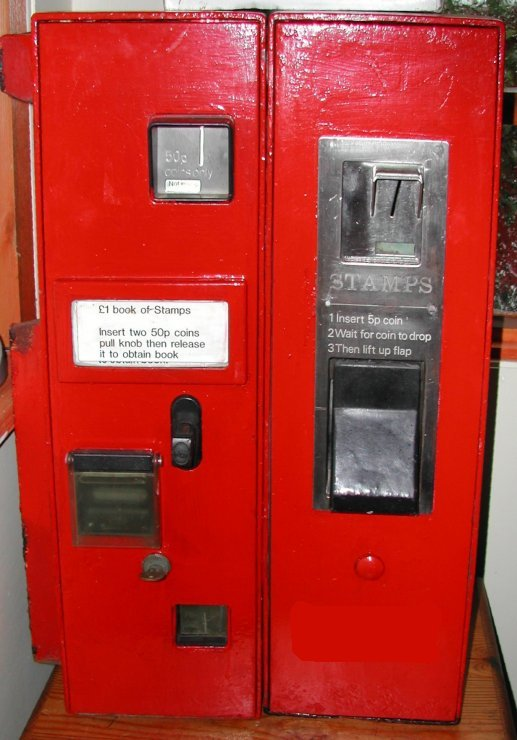
Two Type U housings with (right) a G2 coil vending mech and (left) a Type H booklet vending mech.

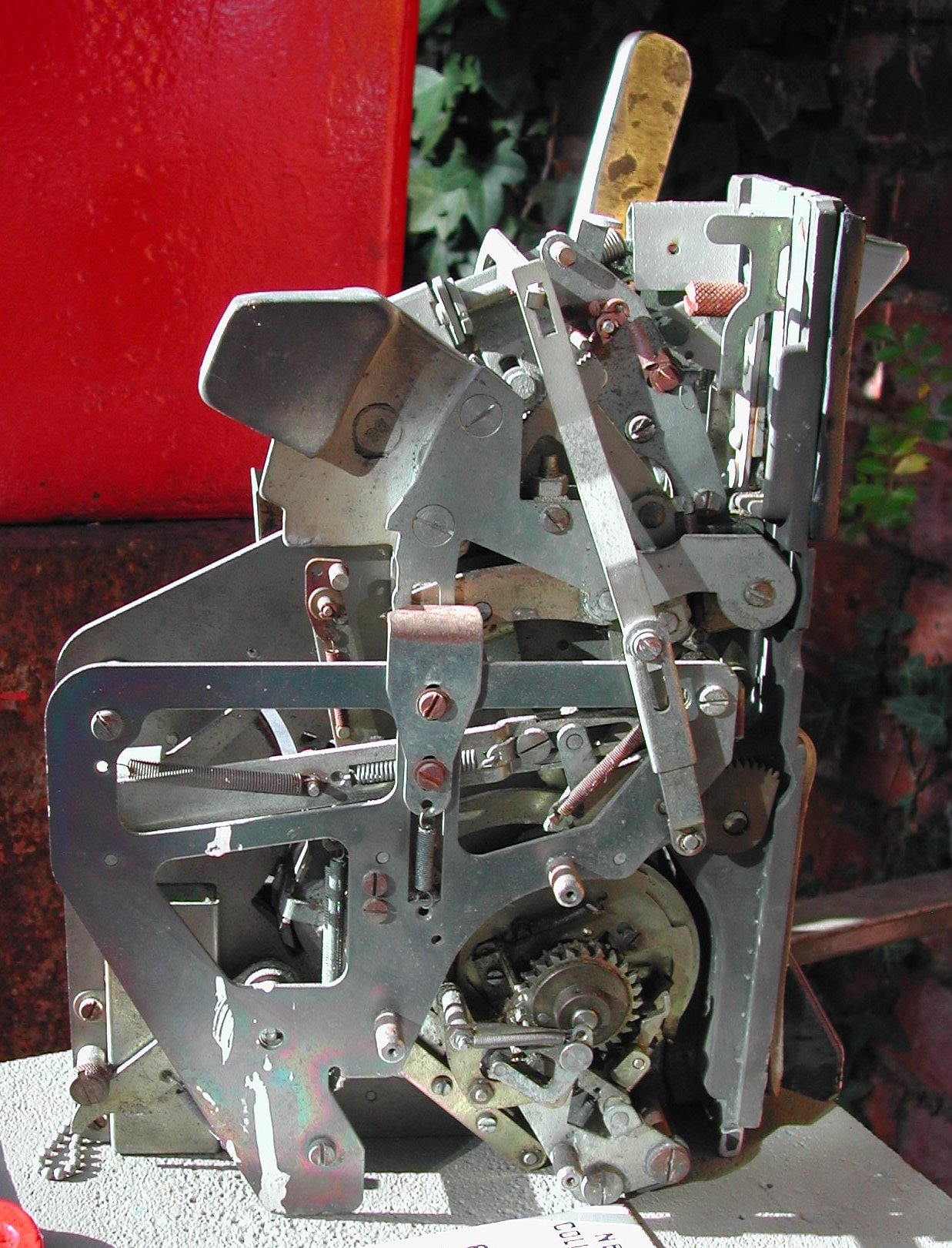
A type G2 coil multi-value vend mechanism showing the mechanical complexity.

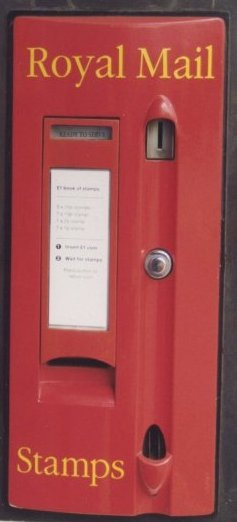
A Hillday Type B52 electromechanical SVM

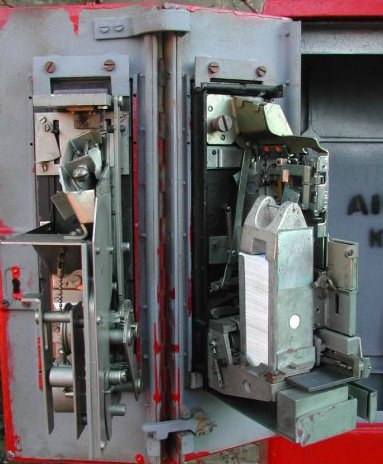
Two mechs in a Type K case - left is the stamp coil mech, right is for booklets at Colne Valley Postal History Museum

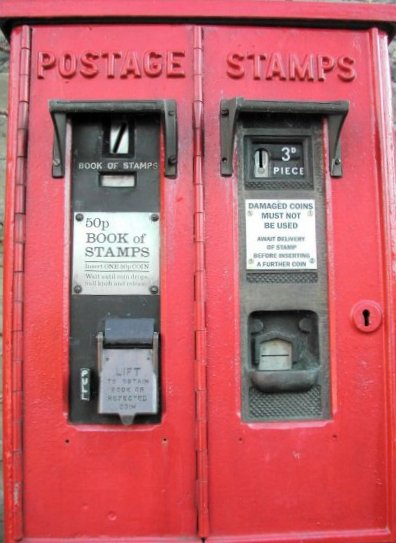
The same pair with the case closed; a Type F 50p booklet mech and a Type B4 3d coil mech.

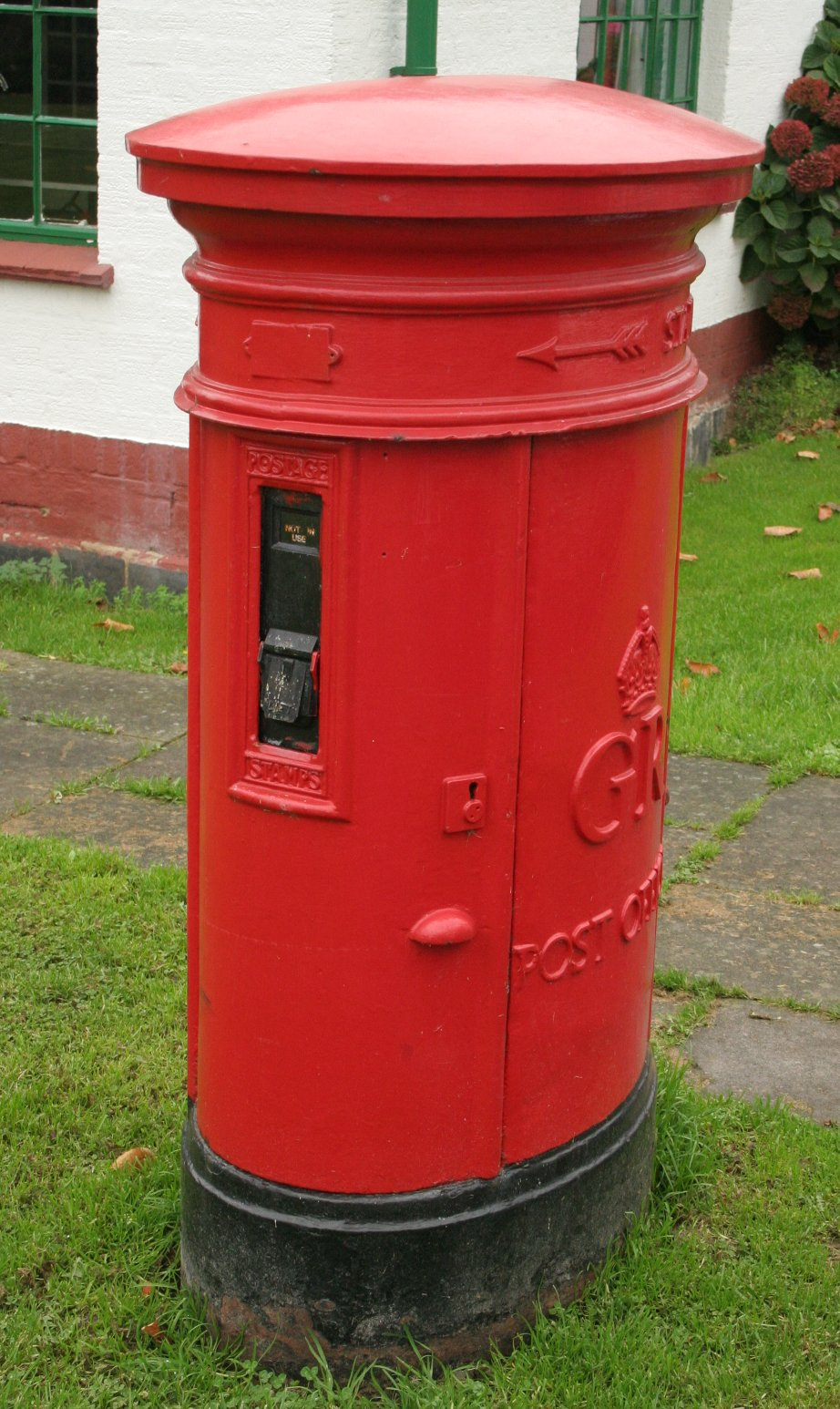
The Type F pillar at Ealing Village, London, showing a 1d B4 SVM incorporated into the design of the box.

== Gallery ==
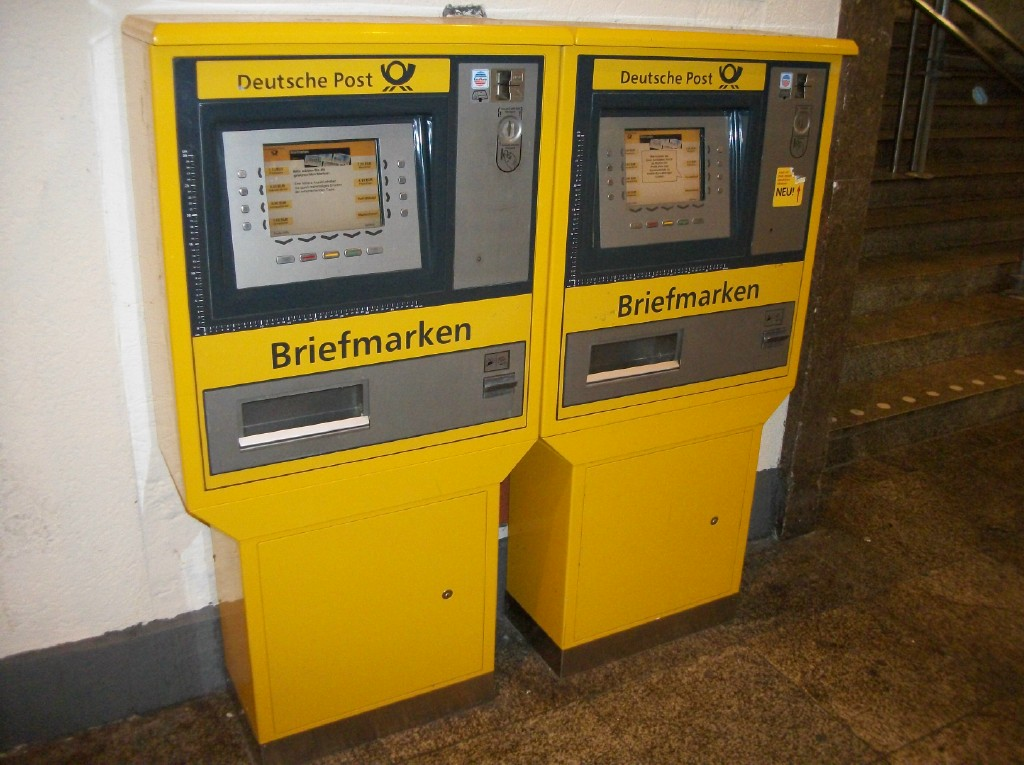
Stamp vending machine at Stuttgart railway station, Germany

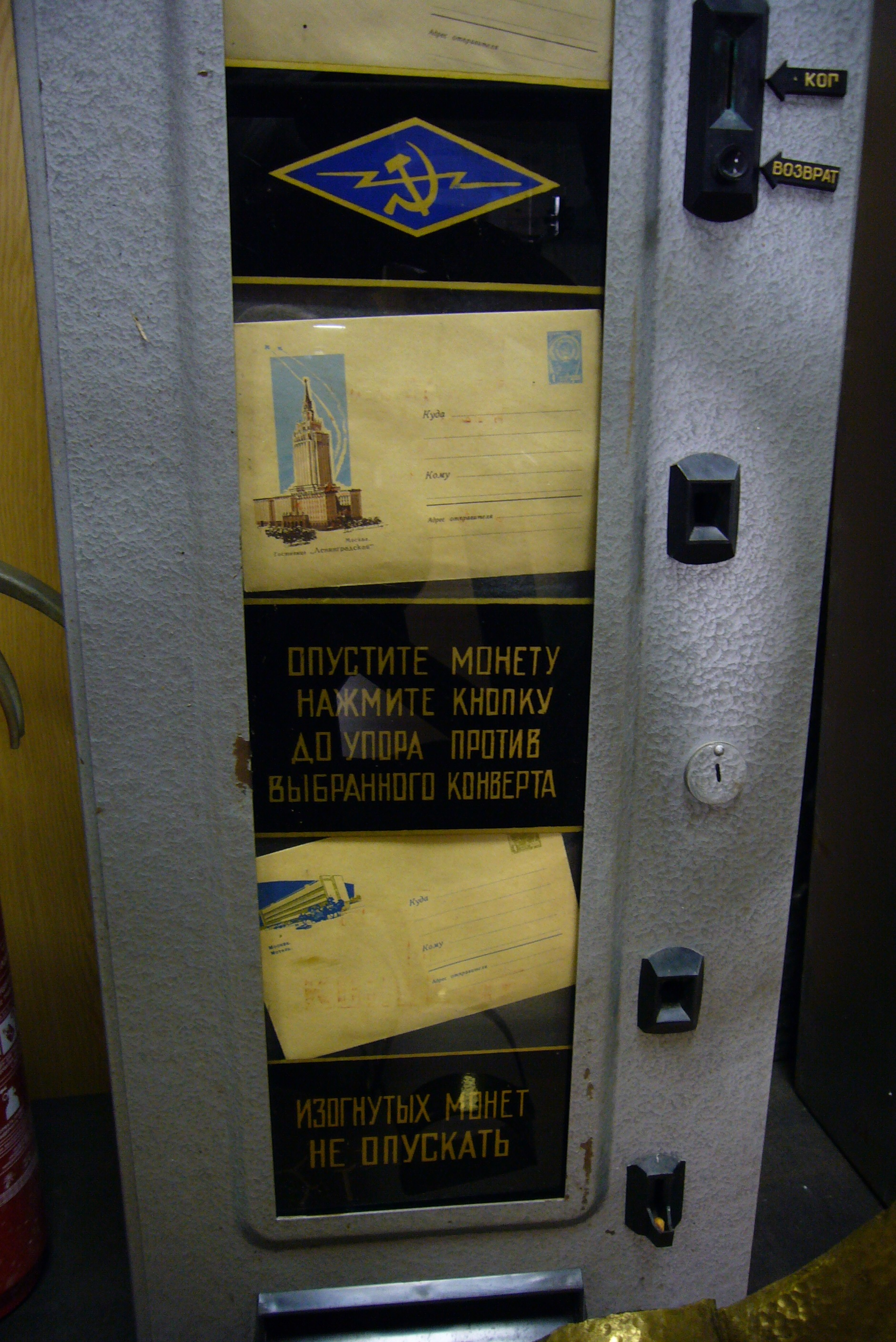
USSR stamped covers vending machine. Postal Museum, Moscow, Russia

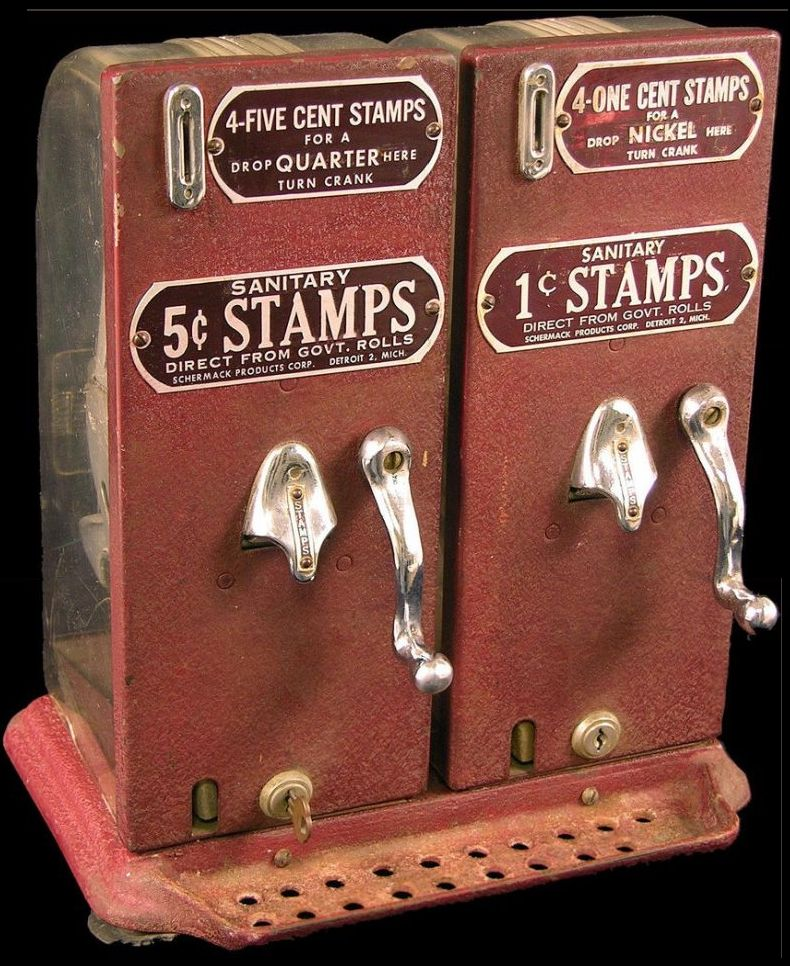
US Schermack stamp vending machine 1950-1960s

== References and sources ==
Notes

Sources

- Corless, H.C. (1960). Stamps of Great Britain Issued in Rolls and the Machines which Use them. Published Privately, UK.
- Robinson, Martin (2000). Old Letter Boxes. Shire Publications, Princes Risborough, UK. ISBN 0-7478-0446-X.
- Morgan, Glenn (2007). Cross Post, Journal of the Friends of BPMA Summer 2007 issue. British Postal Museum & Archive.
