= Variable value stamp =

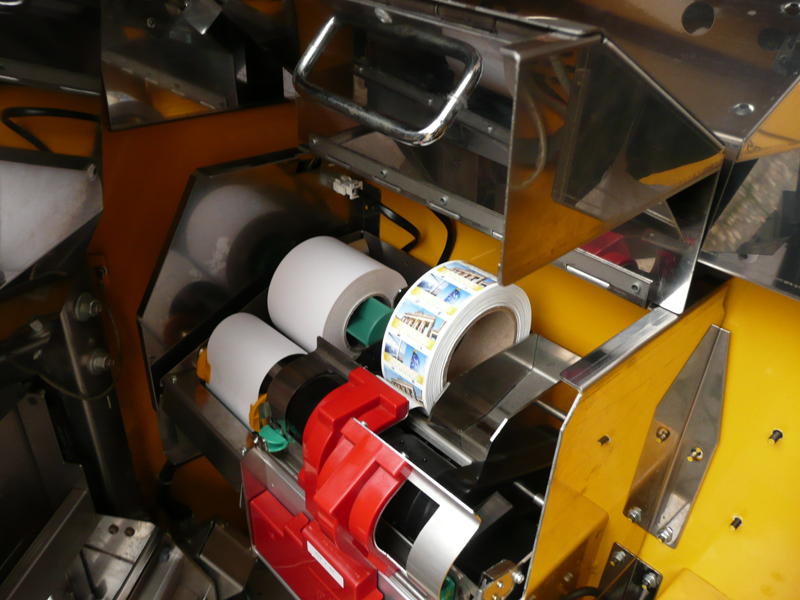
The inside of a variable value stamp vending machine showing the stamps before the value is printed

A variable value stamp is a gummed or self-adhesive postage stamp of a common design, issued by a machine similar to an automatic teller machine (ATM), with a value of the user's choice printed at the time the stamp is dispensed. The value may be variable or from a fixed selection of postal rates. The stamps and machines are typically for use in retail or post office environments. As only the postal value varies from stamp to stamp, these stamps have been described as key type stamps. They are also closely related to meter stamps from postage meters.

As the concept has developed, a variety of different names have been used, including Automatenmarken (Germany), Computer vended postage stamp, ATM stamps (US), Autopost stamps (US), Frama labels (Europe) or machine labels (Stanley Gibbons catalogues).

== History ==
There have been many experiments with similar systems over the years but none has been truly successful until the evolution of modern sophisticated computer printing technology. The development of the postage meter, which performs a similar function in businesses and organisations has also been instrumental in developing the technology.

The first patent for a machine to produce variable postage was taken out by Carl Bushe in 1884. In 1900 Christian Kahrs' machine was tested in Oslo. Similar machines were soon tried in Australia, New Zealand and the United States.

== Frama labels ==
The Frama company of Switzerland produced a special type of patterned paper suitable for dispensing by machine and electronic printing that could be used to create an unlimited number of different stamp designs. The British Post Office used the paper experimentally in vending machines in 1984–85 but the experiment was not regarded as a success. Frama labels were also introduced in Switzerland in 1976. Frama labels were distinctive for the whole design being printed in one operation onto the special paper, including the value, rather than just the value being printed onto a pre-printed stamp.

== ATM stamps and Autopost ==
The U.S. Postal Service experimented with similar stamps in 1989–90. Those experiments also were not considered a success. The U.S. Postal Service owns a patent for an ATM dispensable self-adhesive postage stamp construction.

== Collecting ==
- ATEEME, the Variable Value Stamps Study and Collecting Group, specializes in collecting these items.
- InfoBrief: ATM. Ein Kulleraugen-Informationsdienst (Schellerten), ISSN 0933-1409 (since October 1984)

== See also ==
- Horizon label
- Post & Go stamps
