= Coil stamp =

Postage stamp sold in strips one stamp wide

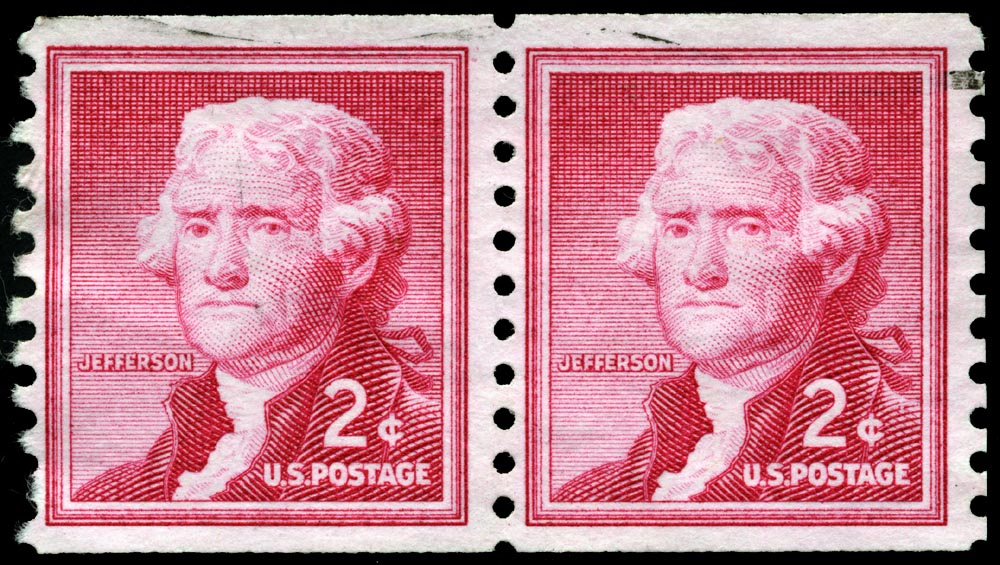
This 2-cent coil stamp of the US 1954 Liberty series was used heavily throughout the 1950s and 60s.

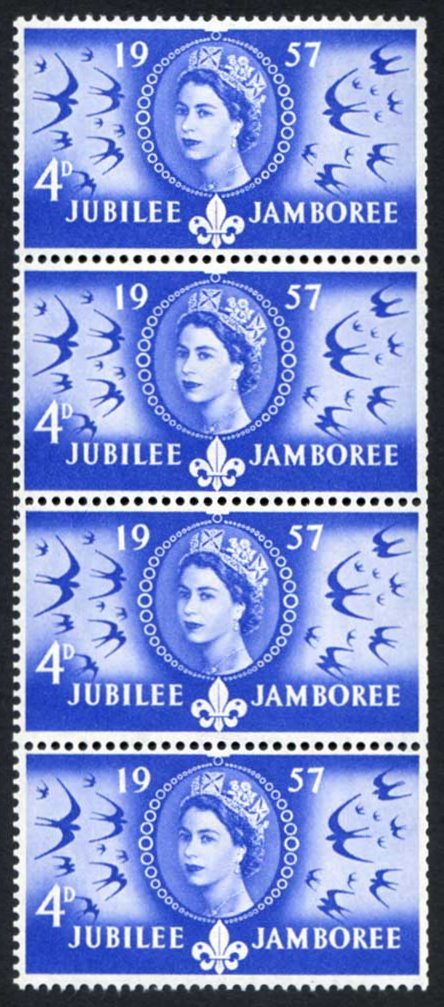
A coil strip of British 1957 Scouting commemorative stamps with the trimming of the perforations on one side clearly visible.

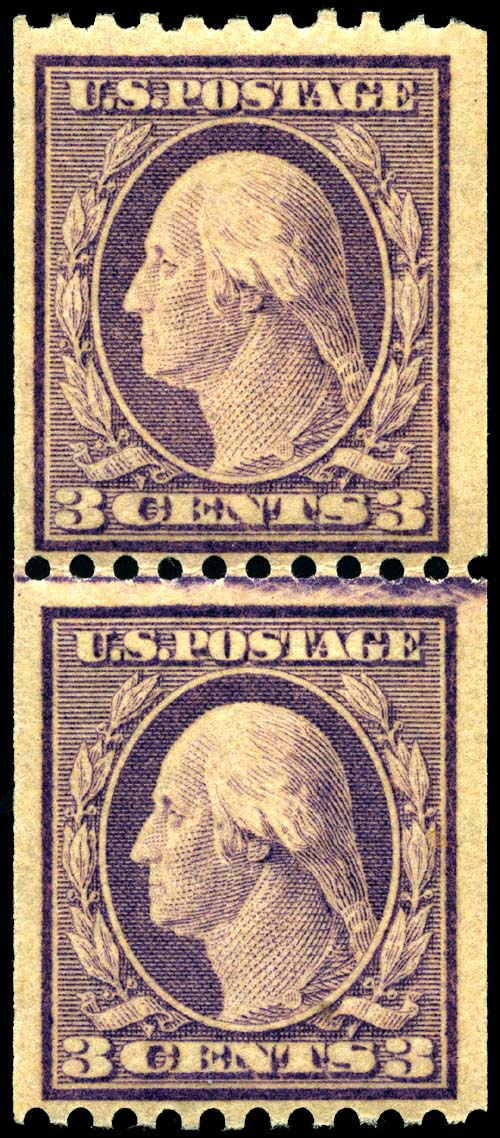
A vertical coil pair with a joint line, US 1917.

A coil stamp is a type of postage stamp sold in strips one stamp wide. The name derives from the usual handling of long strips, which is to coil them into rolls, in a manner reminiscent of adhesive tape rolls. A large percentage of modern stamps are sold in coil form, because they are more amenable to mechanized handling in large quantities than either sheet stamps or booklet stamps.

== Origins ==
Coil stamps first appeared at the beginning of the 20th century. Specifically, the first coil stamps were made in the Netherlands in 1903. See: Coils, a Worldwide Catalog by Hans Jaffé and R. E. Kunz, Cincinnati and Portland Oct. 1980.

== In Sweden ==
While in most countries coil production is restricted to the workaday stamps used in large quantities, Sweden has produced coil versions of most of their stamps since 1920.

== In the United Kingdom ==
In the UK, coil stamps first appeared in 1912, to supply newly installed stamp vending machines. As these were cut from complete sheets, they are perforated on all four sides. As each stamp was worth either a half or one old penny and 240 pence made up one pound sterling, the coils were in rolls of 960 or 480 each.

Why should we distinguish between roll stamps and stamp rolls? While roll stamps were printed in endless strips, usually divided into ten adjacent rolls, stamp rolls were assembled from sheet stamps, by gluing the lower or upper edges of the sheets to the sheet. Such stamp rolls were made, for example, in Hungary. There, stamps with the Turul design from the 1909 issue were made into stamp rolls in 1912. The thin paper and dense perforation of the sheet stamps made it possible to sell the stamps from these rolls by machine feeding. In later issues, attempts to make stamp rolls were unsuccessful due to the thickness of the paper and the rarer perforation. The dispensing machines could not feed the purchased stamps one by one along the perforation. Therefore, rolls assembled from sheets are not considered "roll stamps", but are called stamp rolls and are catalogued separately from roll stamps. See: ATTILA DOBÓ A Hungarian roll stamps handbook and catalogue MABÉOSZ edition, 1996.

== In the United States ==
In the United States, vending machine companies began to experiment with the automated dispensing of stamps. Early efforts to break sheets into strips manually did not work well, since they were prone to tearing and jamming, and soon the companies began to request imperforate sheets from the post office, cutting those into strips and punching holes of various shapes between each stamp. A variety of these "private coils" is known, some quite rare.

The first US government-produced coils appeared in 1908, produced by pasting together enough imperforate sheets to make rolls of 500 or 1,000 stamps, cutting them into strips and perforating between. 1. According to the Scott catalogue of US stamps the first coil stamps were issued in 1895 as part of the first bureau issue. The 1-cent, 2-cent and 5-cent values in the Series of 1902 (Second Bureau Issue) were produced in coil versions, but relatively few copies exist because in late 1908 the series was superseded by the Washington-Franklin Issues. As a result, all Second Bureau coils are quite rare. Even the most common, the horizontal 2-cent coil, can fetch as much as US$2000, while the much rarer, the 1-cent vertical coil, brought $130,000 at an auction in 2009, and the even rarer 2-cent vertical coil (only eight copies are known) would surely sell for considerably more, should one become available.

Later a rotary press was adopted, which eliminated the pasting stage. The cylindrical plate used on a rotary press has a seam where ink tends to accumulate, resulting in joint line pairs.

== Perforations ==
The perforations of coil stamps are usually found along the right and left sides ("vertical perf"), but they have also been produced with perforations along the top and bottom ("horizontal perf"). Longer perforations on one side than the other, and separation by cutting rather than tearing, are indications that a stamp may have come from a coil.

== Recent innovations ==
A recent innovation enabled by self-adhesive technology is the linerless coil stamp. While most self-adhesive stamps have backing paper, linerless coils are like a roll of adhesive tape. Such rolls tend to be enormous, with thousands of stamps, and tend to be used only by large mailing operations.

== See also ==
- 1935 Irish 2d coil stamp An experimental Irish stamp.
- Plate number coil
- Coil waste
