= Horizon label =

Type of variable value postage stamp

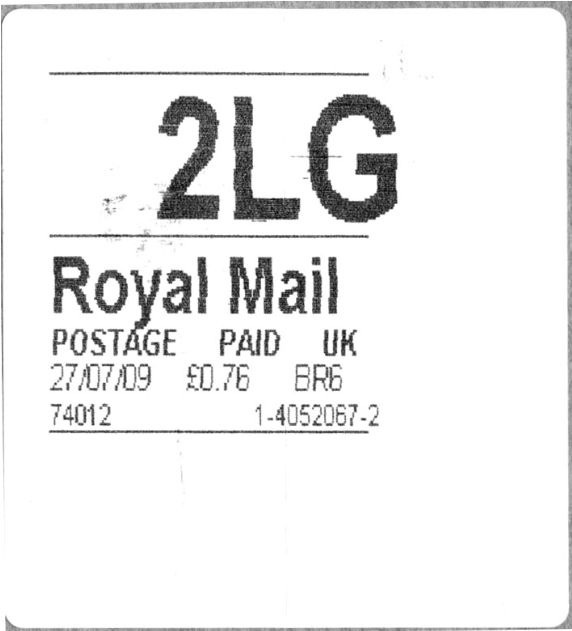
A second class large Horizon label 2009. Early labels were very crude.

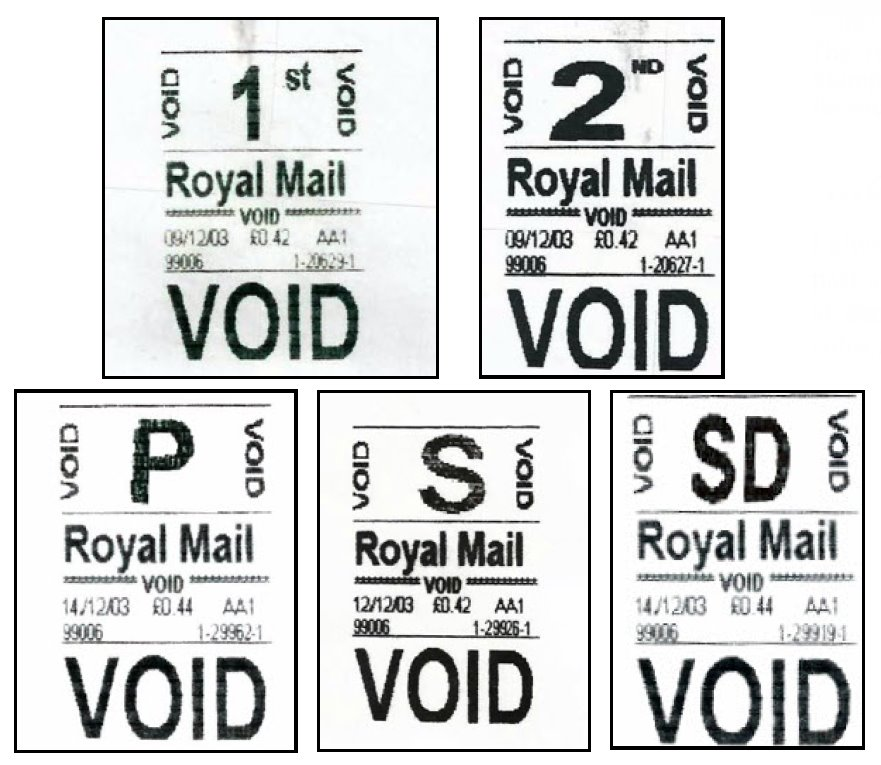
2003 "VOID" Horizon labels for training post office staff

A Horizon label is an adhesive postage label that is a type of variable value stamp. The labels were introduced in the United Kingdom in 2002 as part of the computerisation of the counter services of the post office network of Royal Mail using the Horizon System.

== Reception ==
The labels received a frosty reception from philatelists initially as they were seen as replacing postage stamps, but as they have become more complex and more stamp-like, collectors have warmed to them and they have now become a popular collecting specialism in the U.K. and an established part of modern British postal history.

== Timeline ==
The first labels were large plain labels composed purely of text but later labels are of a gold colour with a Machin head and a repeating pattern of the words ROYALMAIL in order to prevent forgery.

The principal events in the development of the labels were:

- 14 February 2002 – First labels used in about 1000 post offices. Plain white with straight edges.
- 30 April 2002 – Security slits added to prevent reuse.
- August & September 2002 – Labels rolled out nationally.
- April 2009 – Labels with simulated perforations appear.
- 8 June 2009 – First gold labels appear featuring the Machin head for Special Delivery only from the Camden High Street P.O., London. Gold labels gradually introduced nationally.
- 20 April 2010 – First labels with dual English-Welsh language inscriptions available from Welsh post offices.
- 23 August 2010 – Straight-edged labels reintroduced first at Old Street then nationally.
- 29 September 2011 – Value Added Tax codes added.
- May 2015 – "Pre-cancelled" labels trialled at the Europhilex exhibition with corner "Single Use Only" wording. Colour changed back to white. Subsequently used nationally.
- September 2015 – Barcode added to the design.

== Post Office training ==
The training of postal workers includes the use of voided horizon labels, noted as early as 2003.
