= Postage stamp booklet =

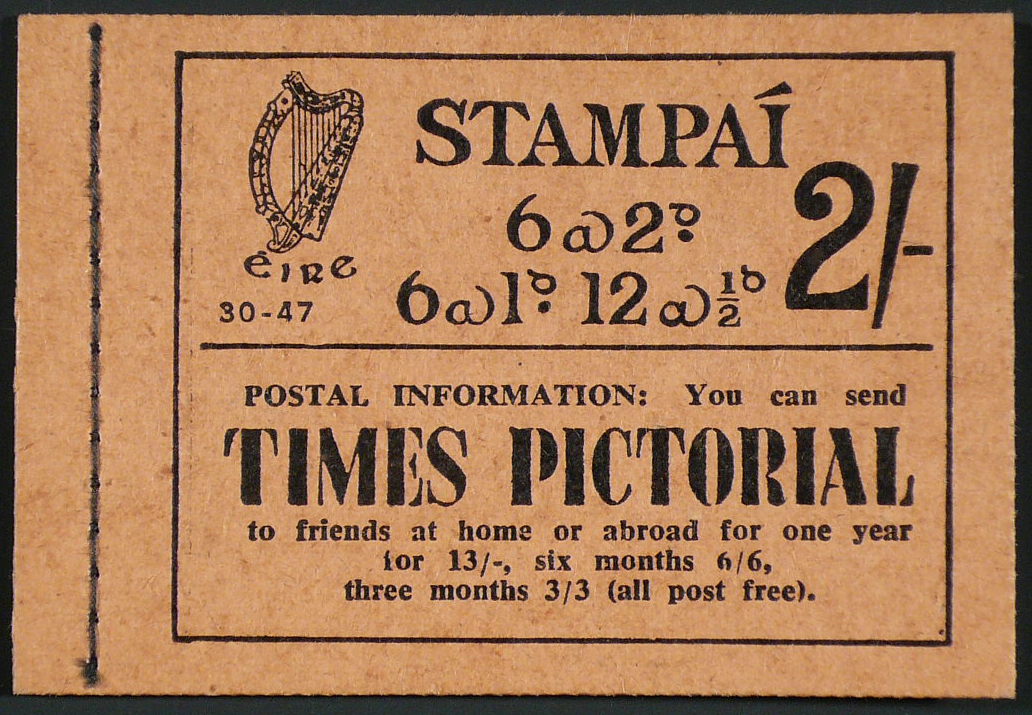
The cover of an Irish 1947 stamp booklet contained 2 shillings worth of stamps showing the serial number and year of issue 30-47 with advertising

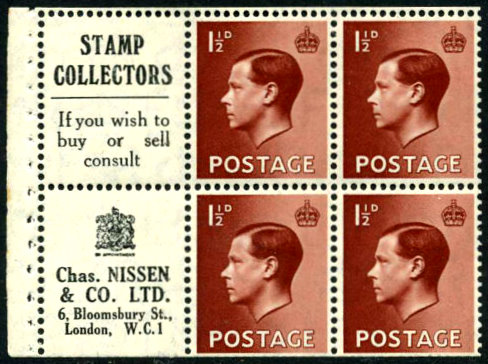
A pane from a British 1936 booklet featuring advertising for stamp dealer Charles Nissen

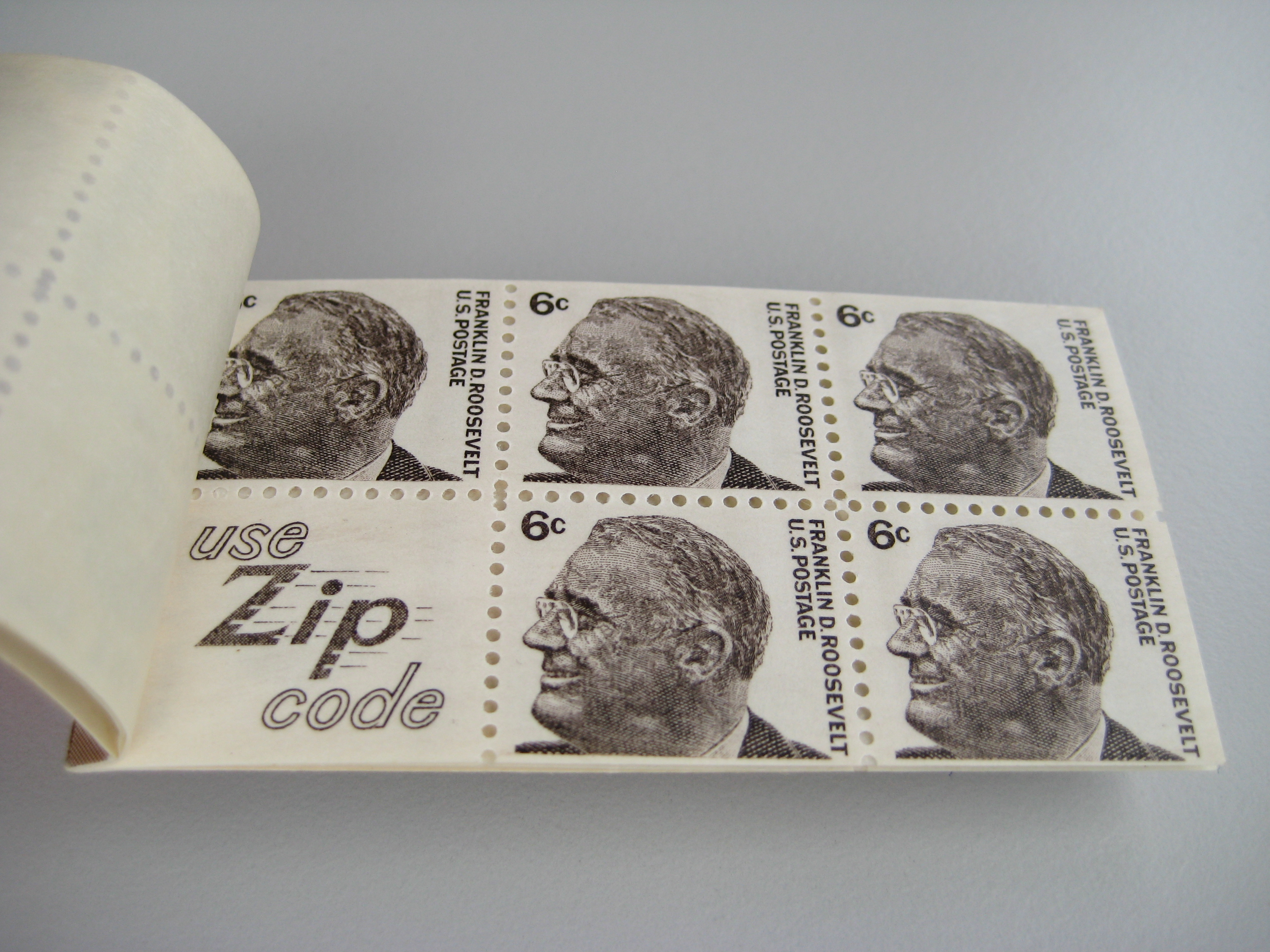
A United States stamp booklet showing one of the panes of stamps

A postage stamp booklet (also called stamp book) is a booklet made up of one or more small panes of postage stamps in a cardboard cover. Booklets are often made from sheets especially printed for this purpose, with a narrow selvage at one side of the booklet pane for binding. From the cutting, the panes are usually imperforate on the edges of the booklet. Smaller and easier to handle than a whole sheet of stamps, in many countries booklets have become a favored way to purchase stamps.

== History ==
Booklets of telegraph stamps are known to have been issued by the California State Telegraph Company in 1870, and by Western Union in 1871, and on 14 October 1884 an A.W. Cooke of Boston received Patent 306,674 from the United States Patent Office for the idea of putting postage stamps into booklets.

Luxembourg was the first country to issue booklets, in 1895, followed by Sweden in 1898, the United States in 1900 and Great Britain in 1904. The idea became popular and quickly spread around the world.

== Production ==
Originally booklets were produced manually, by separating sheets into smaller panes and binding those. These are not distinguishable from the sheet stamps. Later, the popularity of booklets meant that it was worthwhile to produce booklet panes directly; printing onto large sheets, then cutting into booklet panes each with a small number of stamps, and perforating between the stamps of each pane. Such sheets, in fact, were created to produce the earliest United States booklets, printed from special plates that yielded sheets of 180 or 360 stamps for cutting into panes of six stamps each. (Normal sheets containing 400 stamps were deemed unusable for booklets because they could not be cut into six-stamp panes without leaving waste.) Booklet stamps so produced usually have one, two, or three straight edges (although some booklet panes have been printed three stamps across, and the middle stamps will have perforations all around). The first two U. S. booklet issues (1900 and 1903) offered only stamps denominated at the normal letter rate (2¢), but in 1907 booklets were introduced containing 1¢ stamps suitable for post cards.

Some countries, such as Sweden, routinely issue a single stamp design in coils, booklets, and sheets. The complete stamp collection will contain examples of each of these. Some collectors specialize in collecting the booklets themselves, or whole panes from a booklet; these often sell at a premium over the equivalent number of stamps. The oldest types of booklets were not much noticed at the time, nearly all used for postage, and intact booklets are quite rare today.
