= Mint stamp =

Philatelogical term for a type of stamp

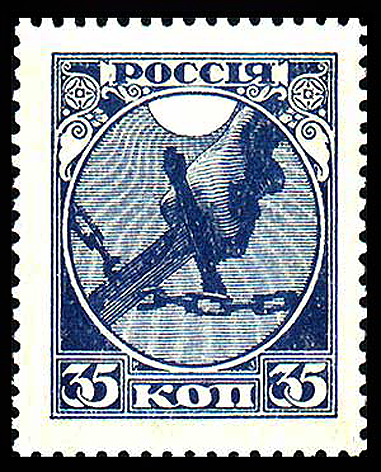
This mint stamp of the 1918 Russian revolution era is much less commonly found used.

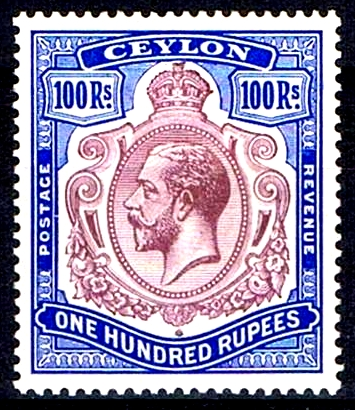
A mint high value 100 Rupee key type stamp of Ceylon valid for postage or revenue use and vulnerable to tampering to remove a fiscal cancel to make it appear to be a more valuable unused stamp.

In philately, a mint stamp is one which is unused, has never been mounted and has the original gum, (if issued with gum). The term applies equally to postage stamps and revenue stamps.

In practice, the term is used within philately to refer to any stamp that appears to be unused with gum. It also includes those without gum but only when they have been issued without gum.

To avoid confusion the various states of mint can be distinguished in the abbreviations stated under "Variations".

== Variations ==
Variations of the term mint include:

- Mint hinged (MH) – the stamp is unused but has been previously hinged. Remains of the hinge or gum disturbance are visible.
- Mounted mint (MM) – the same as mint hinged.
- Mint no gum (MNG) – the stamp is as has been issued without gum.
- Unmounted mint (UM) – the stamp is unused and appears never to have been mounted.
- Mint never hinged (MNH) – the same as unmounted mint but with an assertion that the stamp is not a formerly mounted stamp that has been tampered with to remove traces of mounting.

The hinging referred to in these terms is mounting of the stamp in a stamp album by the application of a stamp hinge to the back of the stamp. The highest grade is unmounted mint or mint never hinged. The term mint never hinged has developed to provide reassurance to buyers that the stamp has not been tampered with to remove traces of mounting, as the term unmounted mint was thought to be ambiguous.

In practice only the terms MNH and MH are used, but in some cases the term MNG when there are no, or hardly any stamps are known with gum.

== Value ==
Mint stamps are often more valuable than used stamps as in many cases fewer mint stamps survive. A mint stamp may also be in better condition than a used stamp which has passed through the mail. Sometimes, however, used stamps may be more valuable than mint ones where higher numbers of mint stamps have survived, perhaps because large numbers of mint stamps were bought by collectors but few used on letters.

== Tampering ==
Differences between mint and used values for the same stamp have led to a small industry in removing, or adding, postal cancellations to stamps. Another common practice is to attempt to remove fiscal cancellations, which are often pen cancels, in order to change a stamp used fiscally (for tax purposes) to one apparently unused. Stamps available for both postage and revenue (fiscal) purposes are usually worth more unused or with a postal cancellation. Madame Joseph specialised in the addition of forged cancels to stamps that were worth more used than unused.

== See also ==
- Mint condition
- Postage stamp gum
- Regummed stamp
- Stamp condition
