= Stamp condition =

Philatelic classification

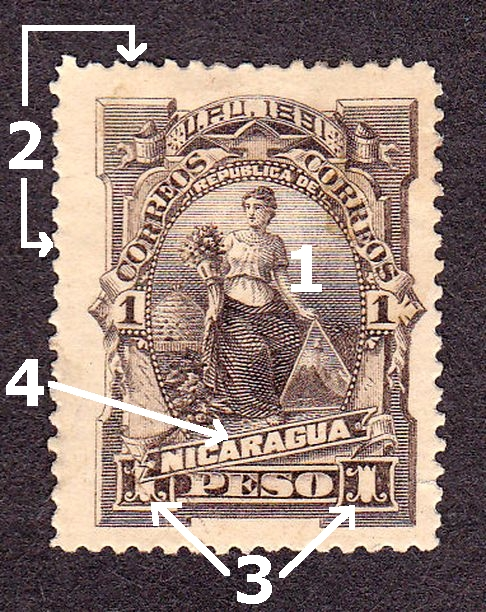

The value of a postage stamp in the stamp collecting market depends on various features of its condition. Among the features assessed are centering, margins, and gum.

== Centering and margins ==
The following grades convey how well centered the stamp is and the width of the stamp's margins.

- Superb is sometimes used for a perfect stamp.
- Extra fine (EF) or extremely fine (XF) is a perfectly centered stamp with wide margins.
- Very fine (VF) is a well centered stamp with ample margins.
- Fine (F) is a stamp that is significantly offset but still has four margins.
- Average (Avg.) is a stamp that has no margin on at least one side with a portion of the design trimmed off or cut into by perforations. Except for rare or very old stamps average stamps are not collected or sold except as space-fillers or reference copies. Heavy cancellations which obliterate the design can also be considered.
- Poor is a stamp which is heavily canceled, soiled, cut to shape. Only great rarities such as the British Guiana 1c magenta are collected in poor condition.

Rare or unusual stamps can be submitted for Philatelic expertisation. The opinions of experts differ and have evolved over time. Conflicting expert opinions on stamp grading can have a huge effect on a stamp's value.

== Gum ==
Another key factor in the case of mint stamps is the presence or absence of postage stamp gum and whether the gum has been disturbed.

- Mint never-hinged (MNH or Mint NH, NH, u/m) is an unused stamp that has full original undisturbed gum with no trace of damage done by a stamp hinge. Stamps sell at a considerable premium if they are in this condition.
- Lightly hinged (LH) is a mint stamp which was hinged but only slightly disturbed.
- Heavily hinged (HH) is a mint stamp which was hinged and damaged in the process.
- Hinge remaining (HR) is a mint stamp which has part of a stamp hinge on the back.
- Original gum (OG): A stamp with its original gum, yet deteriorated by age.
- No Gum (NG): Stamp's gum has been washed off. Rarely, stamps are issued with no gum.
- Regummed (RG): Fresh gum has been applied to the stamp. Poor regumming can be detected by examining the end of the perforations under a microscope. The fresh gum may interfere with the small strands of torn paper or even form small droplets.

Stanley Gibbons uses the following to describe stamps with disturbed gum:

- large part o.g.: mounted mint (mint hinged) with the majority of original gum
- part o.g.: mounted mint (mint hinged) with less than 50% of original gum

Postally used stamps usually have no gum and these terms do not apply. An apparently used stamp with gum, for example from the former Soviet bloc, may be "cancelled to order" ("CTO") and have little or no value to collectors.
