= Postage stamp gum =

Type of adhesive for stamps

In philately, gum is the substance applied to the back of a stamp to enable it to adhere to a letter or other mailed item. The term is generic, and applies both to traditional types such as gum arabic and to synthetic modern formulations. Gum is a matter of high importance in philately.

== History ==
Before postage stamps existed, people receiving letters would have to pay for them. The payment was based on how many papers were in the envelope and how far the letter had traveled. Rowland Hill came up with a solution of prepayment. This led to his invention of stamp gum in 1837. The world's first adhesive postage stamp was called the Penny Black. Many early stamps were not gummed, however, and some have been unable to be gummed due to shortage (for instance, the typewritten Uganda Cowry stamps of 1895). Extreme tropical climates were also a problem for Curaçao and Suriname. Some stamps, intended only for sale to stamp collectors, have been issued without gum, for instance the United States Farley's Follies souvenir sheets of 1933. On the first stamps of Great Britain the gum was called cement and was made from a mixture of potato starch, wheat starch and acacia gum.

== Types and application ==
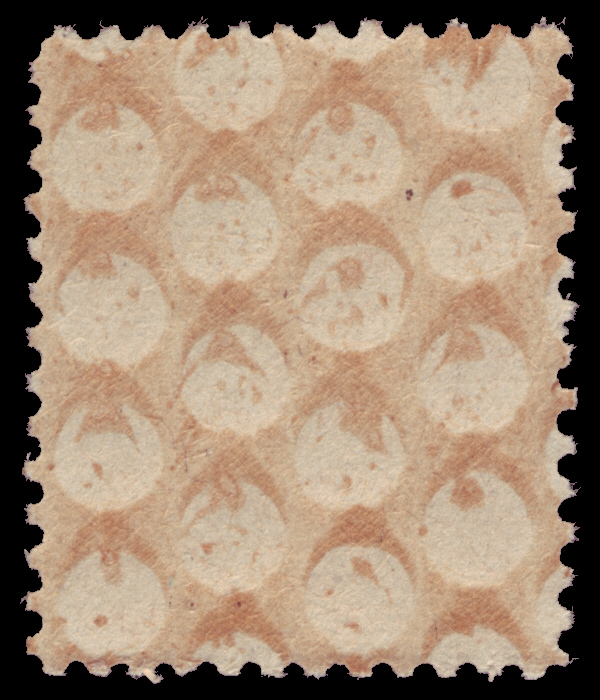
Reverse of a stamp with "economy gum" issued in Allied-occupied Germany

Originally, gumming took place after printing and before perforation, usually because the paper had to be damp for printing to work well, but in modern times most stamp printing is done dry on pre-gummed paper. There have been a couple of historical instances where stamps were regummed after being perforated, but these were unusual situations.

On early issues, gum was applied by hand, using a brush or roller, but in 1880 De La Rue came up with a machine gumming process using a printing press, and gum is now always applied by machine. The gum is universally spread as uniformly as possible.

The greatest manufacturing problem of the gumming process is its tendency to make the stamps curl, due to the different reaction of paper and gum to varying moisture levels. In the most extreme cases, the stamp will spontaneously roll up into a small tube. Various schemes have been tried, but the problem persists to this day. On Swiss stamps of the 1930s, Courvoisier used a gum-breaking machine that pressed a pattern of small squares into the gum, resulting in so-called grilled gum. Another scheme has been to slice the gum with knives after it has been applied. In some cases the gum solves the problem itself by becoming "crackly" when it dries.

The appearance of the gum varies with the type and method of application, and may range from nearly invisible to dark brown globs. Types of gum (adhesives) used on stamps include:

- dextrin, produced by heating starch, invented by Victor Bloede
- gum arabic or acacia gum, derived from the acacia plant
- glue, from gelatin, rarely seen on stamps
- polyvinyl alcohol

Some stamps have had gum applied in a pattern resembling a watermark, presumably as an additional security device. German stamps from 1921 had a pattern of wavy lines while Czech stamps from 1923 had gum showing the initials of the Czech Republic, CSP. These patterns have been called gum devices or gum watermarks. Due to shortages of material, such as in the situation following World War II in Germany, stamps may be gummed in an economy fashion. This so-called economy gum (German: Spargummi) is only applied in patches.

== Self-adhesive stamps ==
In recent years, the use of self-adhesive stamps, otherwise known as pressure-sensitive stamps, has become widespread. This relatively new form of stamps has a smooth waxed or polymer-coated release carrier backing to which the pressure-sensitive adhesive of the stamp does not adhere as strongly as on paper. Therefore, the stamps can be released easily from the backing and placed onto a postal envelope. The first use was by Sierra Leone in 1964, and the United States tried it later on a 1974 Christmas stamp; this was judged a failure and was not reintroduced until 1989 when it gradually became widespread. In the 1990s, the U.S. Post Office began transitioning from water-based stamps into the use of self-adhesive stamps. By 1995, only 20 percent of the thirty-five billion stamps the Post Office produced every year were self-adhesive, yet by 2013 almost all U. S. stamps issued had become self-adhesive.

== Health risks ==
A 1965 British study of the transmission of bacteria and viruses on gummed paper found that "Although pathogenic bacteria and viruses were not isolated from sample envelopes obtained from various sources, the gums used in manufacture were found to exert a protective effect against death from desiccation on the bacteria and viruses which had been introduced into them" and it was possible to demonstrate bacterial multiplication in the gum used for the manufacture of postage stamps." The authors added the warning that "postage stamps are often handled very carelessly when issued over the counter, and yet the purchaser will usually lick them without hesitation. The present work shows how readily bacteria can adhere to the surface of gummed paper which has been slightly moistened; and the finger is a suitable source both of moisture and of bacterial contamination."

A 1996 episode of the popular sitcom Seinfeld featured a character (Susan Ross) who was poisoned after licking the flap of too many gummed envelopes. The episode has been linked anecdotally to an increase in worries about the health risks of licking gummed paper and it has been speculated that it may have contributed to the growing popularity of self-adhesive stamps, at least in the United States.

== Philately ==
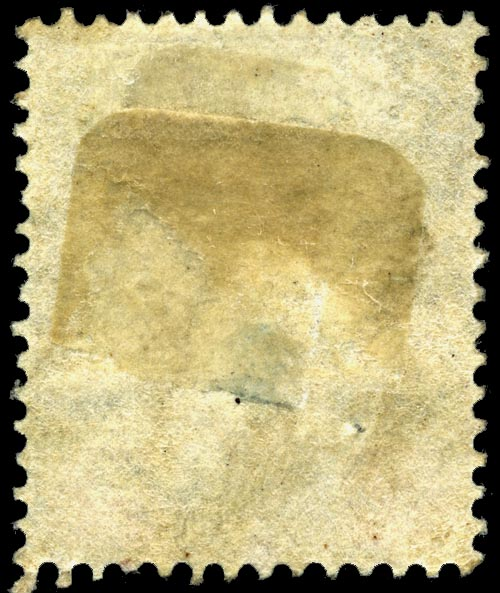
Multiple hinge remnants are visible on the back of this stamp.

=== Condition of unused stamps ===
Stamp gum is an item of importance for collectors, although its presence is rarely of use in differentiating between common and rare stamps, and being on the back of the stamp it is not usually visible. Nevertheless, its condition is reflected in the valuation of unused stamps. Generally, the following conditions are distinguished:

- Mint: stamps with full, undamaged original gum, as sold by the post office. This condition (also called mint, never hinged) is valued highest.
- Unused: stamps whose original gum has been damaged, e.g. through use of stamp hinges, or other influences.
- Unused without gum: stamps which have lost their original gum.

In stamp catalogues, these conditions are abbreviated with the signs **, *, and (*), respectively.

Some stamps have been issued without any gum at all, either due to a lack of materials, or (in particular in tropical countries) to avoid the risk of stamp sheets sticking together. Such stamps cannot be found other than in (*) condition. Traditionally, in particular before World War II, stamps were mounted in albums with stamp hinges no matter whether they were used or unused. Hence some experts claim that very few unused stamps from the 19th century have not been hinged at some point in their existence. This means that old unused stamps in supposedly mint condition often come under suspicion of having been regummed, and the detection of regummed stamps is an important part of philatelic expertisation. Regummed stamps cannot be valued any higher than unused stamps without gum.

Dedicated philatelists strive to maintain the integrity of the backing gum, because such stamps are considered more desirable than stamps without their backing gum. The removal of any paper residue that has collected on the gum without removing the gum itself.

In 1906, trouble had constantly arisen due to the gum on the under face of the stamps. There was an official notice that stated that stamps were going to be prepared with 'hard' gum, and were intended for use in the summer or humid season to prevent the premature sticking together of the stamps, or the sticking to the paraffin paper when in book form.

=== Varieties ===
Stamps that have text, numbers, or symbols imprinted on the adhesive are of special interest. e.g. to thematic collectors if the imprint is related to the occasion of the stamp issue, such as on the 1909 Hudson-Fulton Celebration stamps of the United States. Stamps printed on the gummed side by mistake are sought after by collectors with an interest in uncommon varieties.

The gum of older stamp issues often causes the unused stamps to roll. To avoid this, some postal authorities, e.g. in Germany in the 1930s and 1940s, had the gum broken by rollers, leading to its serration. The orientation of this serration is used to distinguish between different production runs.

=== Paper damage through stamp gum ===
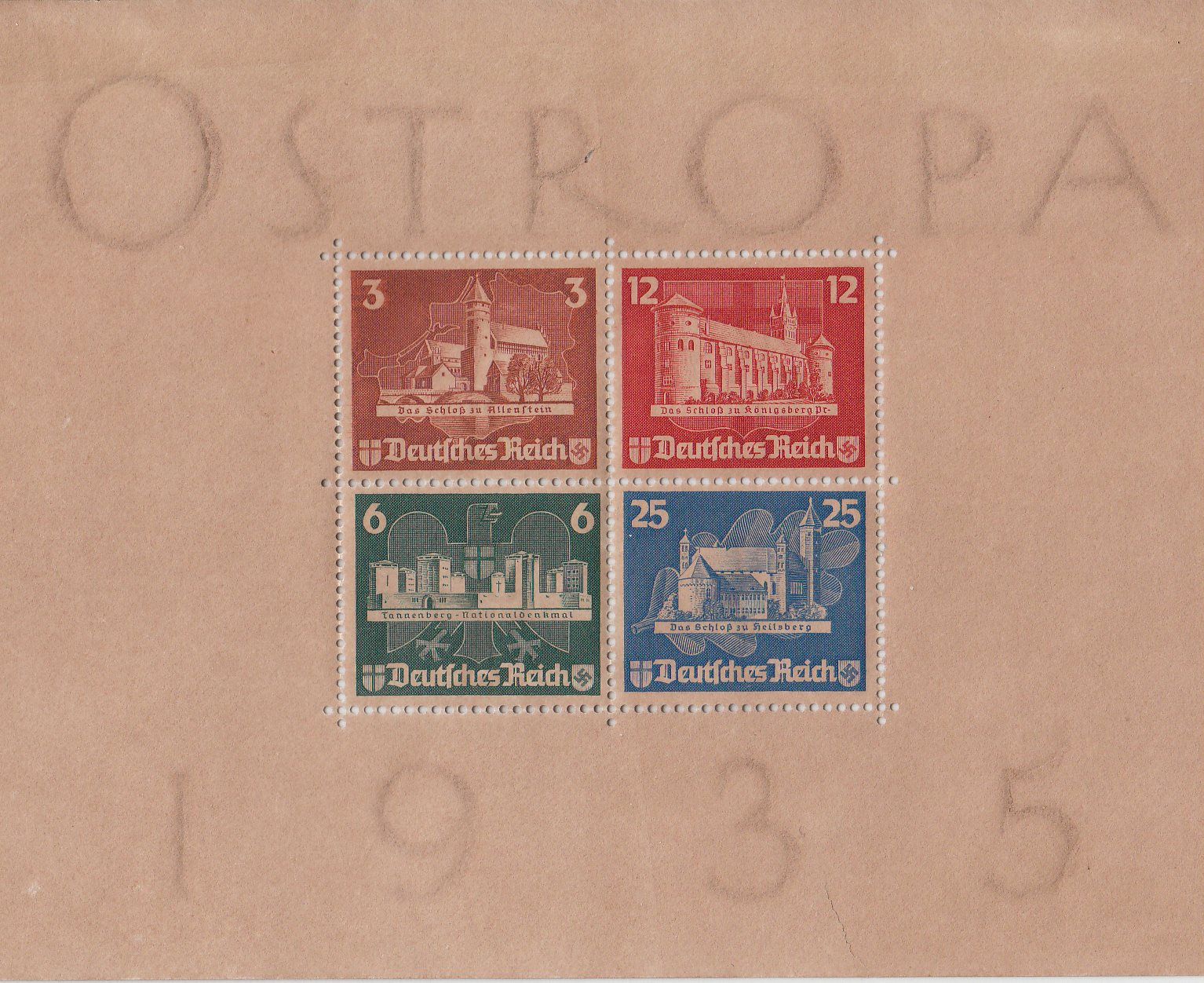
Mint Ostropa commemorative sheet, paper discoloured by the acidic stamp gum, paper beginning to disintegrate at the watermarks

Care must be taken during production that stamp gum, in particular if prepared from natural materials, does not contain an excess of acid. The latter can destroy the stamp paper over time. Notable cases are the Ostropa commemorative sheet issued in Germany in 1935, and the German Zeppelin airmail stamps of 1936.

The thick gum on some older stamps, namely on issues of Austria-Hungary, tends to break due to changes in air humidity and temperature. Such breaks can also affect the stamp paper and cause the stamps to disintegrate. In such cases, stamp catalogs recommend to remove the gum to avoid further damage to the stamps.

== References and sources ==
Sources

- Bells, Mary. "History of Stamps." About. Web. 20 October 2013.
- "History of Stamps." The American Philatelic Society. Web. 20 October 2013.
- Johnson, Stanley Currie. The Stamp Collector: A Guide to the World's Postage Stamps. H. Jenkins Limited. 1920. p 24.
- Poole, Bertram. The Standard Philatelic Dictionary. Beverly, Mass.: Severn-Wylie- Jewett Co., 1922. Print
- Sutton, Richard. The Stamp Collector's Encyclopaedia. New York: Philosophical Library, 1966. Print.
