= MEPSI =

Mexican philatelic organization

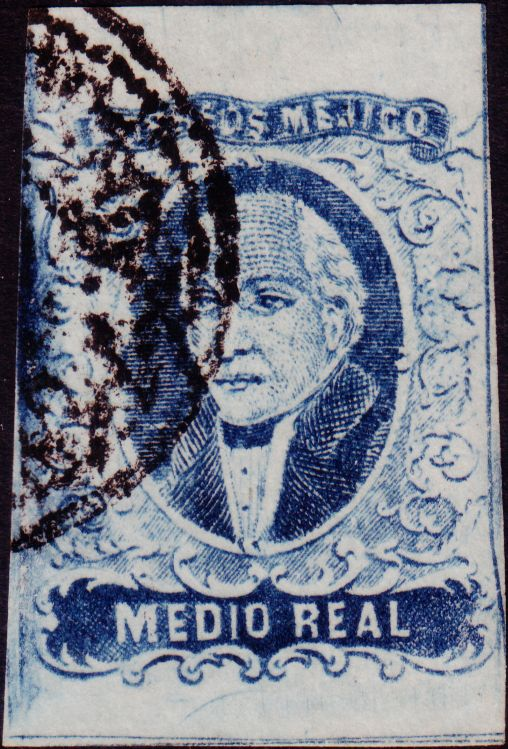
Hidalgo issue 1856. District Apam, no name (remainder). Plate I, position 60.

Mexico Elmhurst Philatelic Society International, better known as MEPSI, is an organization devoted to the study of all aspects of the postal history of Mexico. It was founded in 1935 as the Elmhurst Philatelic Society. It narrowed its focus to Mexican stamps in 1942. MEPSI became a non-profit corporation under Illinois statues on February 6, 1957 and is a tax exempt educational organization under Internal Revenue Code section 501(c)(3).

MEPSI is American Philatelic Society affiliate #43. It has the largest following in Mexico and the United States. However, the over 500 members are spread over more than 27 countries.

== Society services ==
MEPSI offers the following services to its members:

- Mexicana, an award winning quarterly journal.
- A reference library
- Philatelic expertization
- Publication of literature related to the philately of Mexico.

== See also ==
- Postage stamps and postal history of Mexico
