= Stockbook =

Book used for storing postage stamps

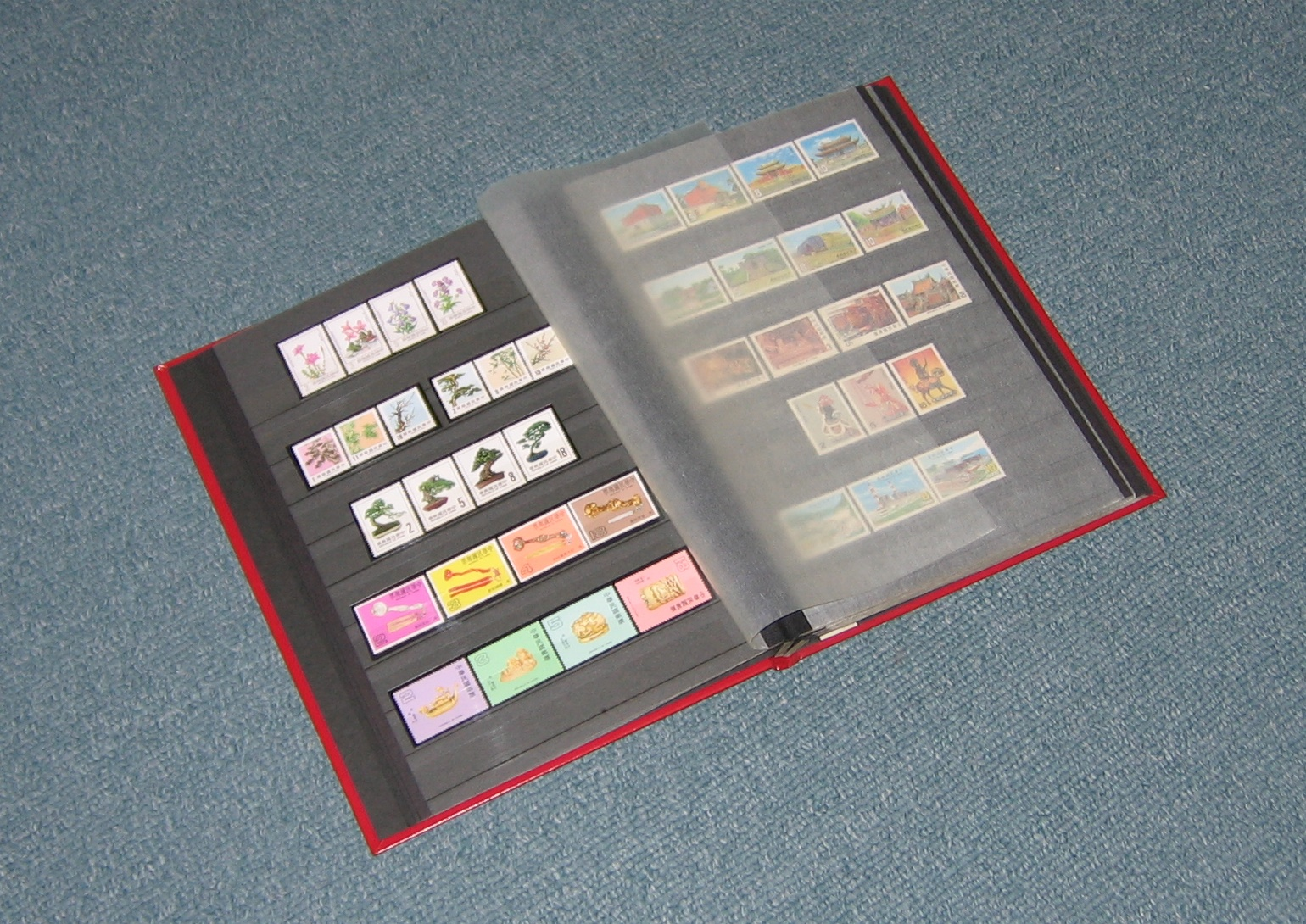
A traditional stockbook with 10 horizontal strips for stamps

Stockbooks are storage books used by stamp collectors for storage of postage stamps placed in pockets, on pages, for easy viewing. Other philatelic items, such as plate blocks, miniature sheets, covers, lettersheets, etc., can be stored in stockbooks.

== Construction ==
Stockbooks consist of a number of stiff pages, made up with horizontal pockets of manilla paper, glassine paper or clear film, into which stamps are placed. Collectors can insert stamps side by side in a row or can overlap stamps when individual viewing is not necessary. The pages, usually double-sided, are bound into book form. The most popular sizes comprise between 4 and 32 double-sided pages with each page interleaved with a glassine, or clear, sheet to prevent stamps on adjacent pages from touching.

As with most stationery, most manufacturers refer to the number of sides in a stockbook and not to the number of pages, so stockbook advertised as a "16-page stockbook" contains 8 double-sided cardboard pages.

== Stock pages ==
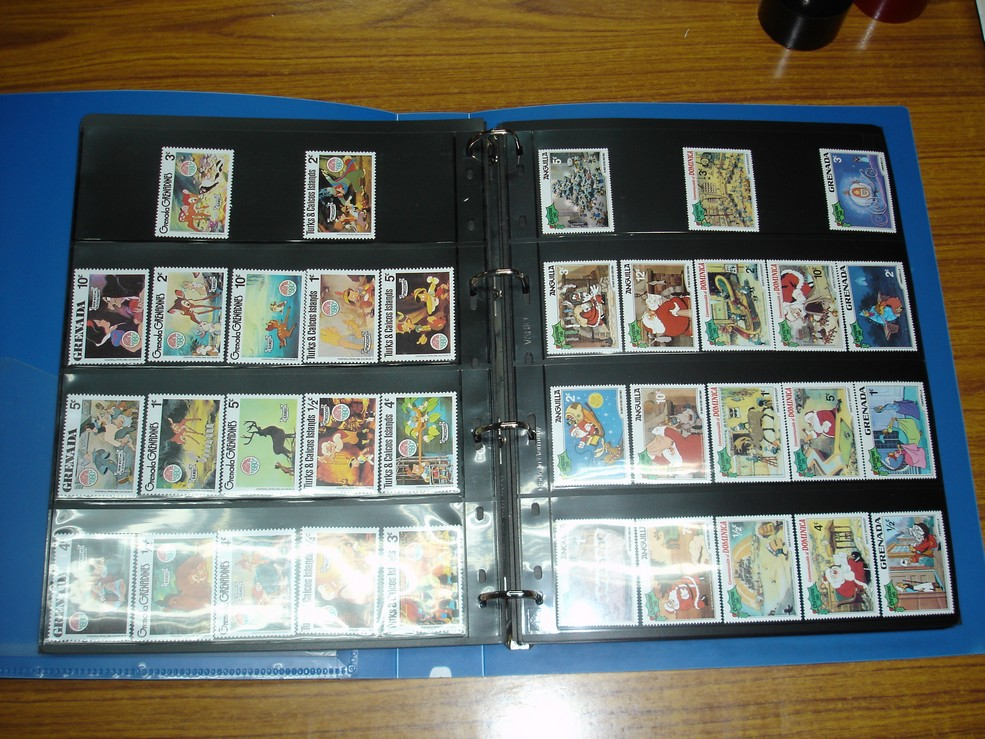
A ring-binder of loose-leaf stock pages – with deep pouches that make interleaving unnecessary and holds stamps securely

Some collectors require more flexibility than a bound stockbook allows, because moving individual stamps from page to page can be time consuming and may cause damage. Several manufacturers produce individual stock pages that can be inserted into loose-leaf folders. Stock pages are usually sold in packages of multiple sheets of 5 or 10 to a packet.

Stock pages are made from plastic or thick card. In either case they have clear pockets on one or both sides. These pockets are attached on three sides with the top side being open to insert the stamps.

On some sheets the pockets are attached to the page on one side only, that is the bottom side. The sides are left unattached so that the pocket can be lifted open to place a stamp or a philatelic item. This arrangement reduces the chance of damage, since unlike in a three-side-attached stock page the stamps are not inserted or pushed into a pocket.

== Advantages and disadvantages ==
- As more stamps are acquired they can easily be rearranged.
- There is no need to use stamp hinges.
- Large gaps need not exist, as may happen with a stamp album that has fixed spaces for each particular stamp.
- There is no space for writing notes – some collectors do their write-up on a piece of paper and insert it behind a stamp or in an adjacent row.
- Stamps are not affixed so they can fall out, or become dislodged, if dropped or bumped hard.
- Stockbooks are less suitable for display since the stamps can fall out or be mishandled.

== Manufacturers ==
Manufacturers of stockbooks and stock pages include Stanley Gibbons, Lighthouse, Lindner, Prinz, Safe, Supersafe, G & K, Davo, Schaubek, Vera Trinder, Multi Master, UNI-safe, Climax, Compass, Importa, Rapide and Hagner.

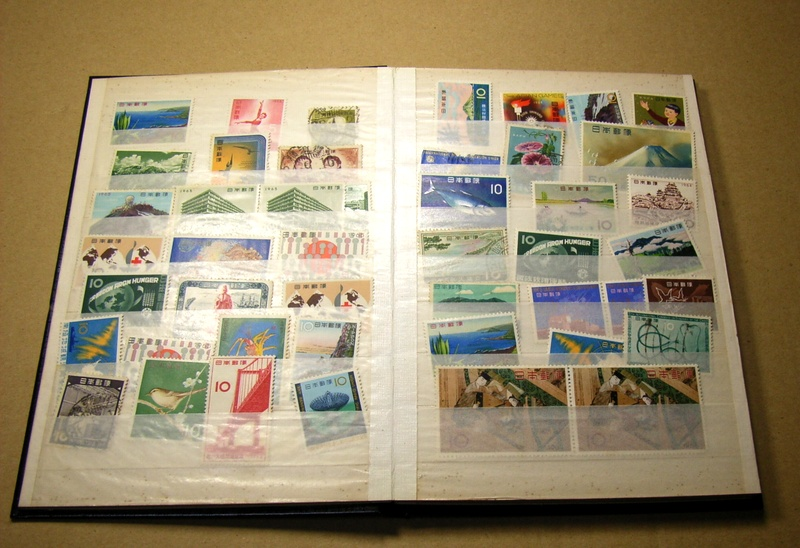
Stockbook without interleaving between pages

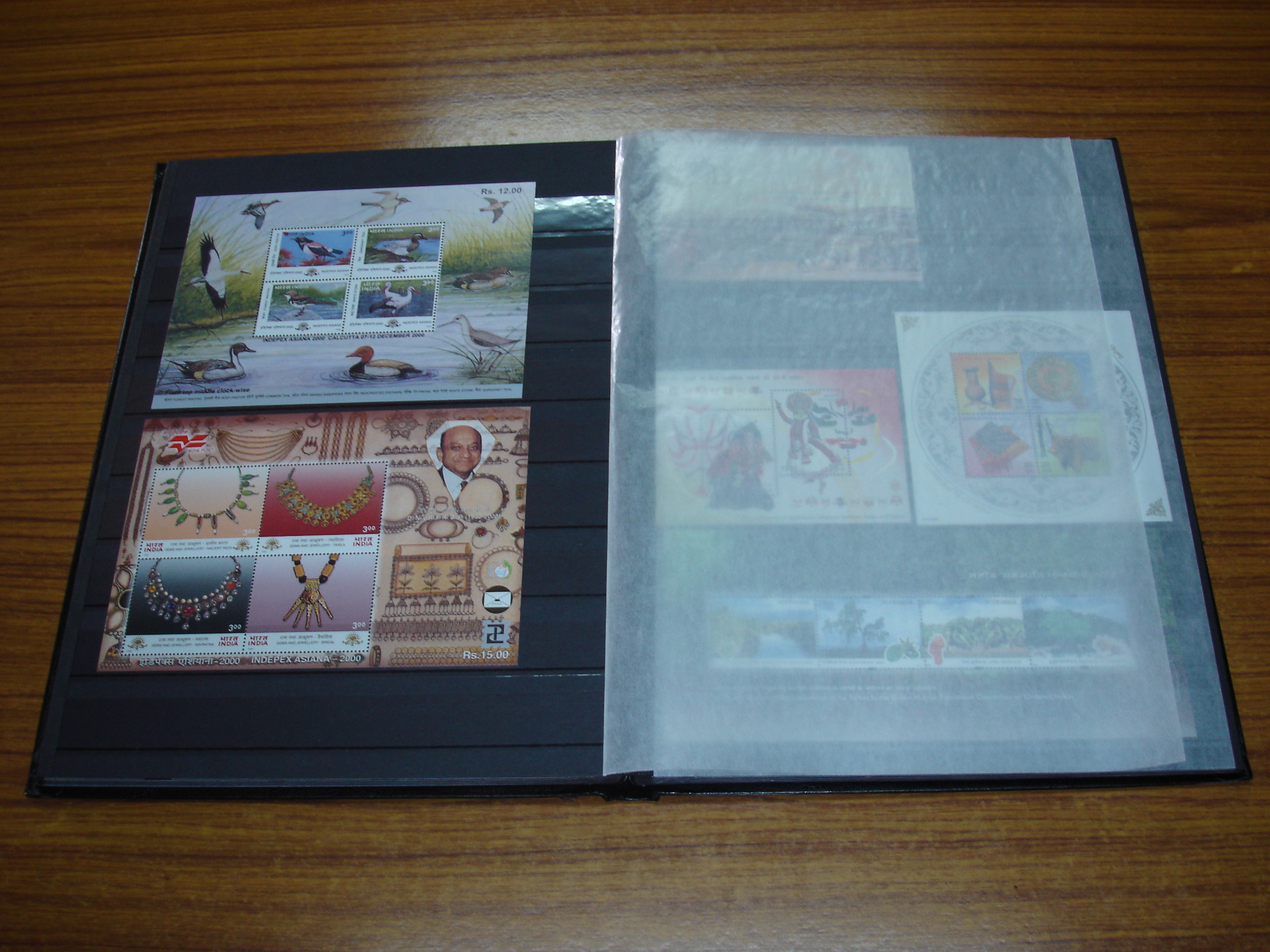
Traditional stockbook with glassine interleaving containing mint miniature sheets

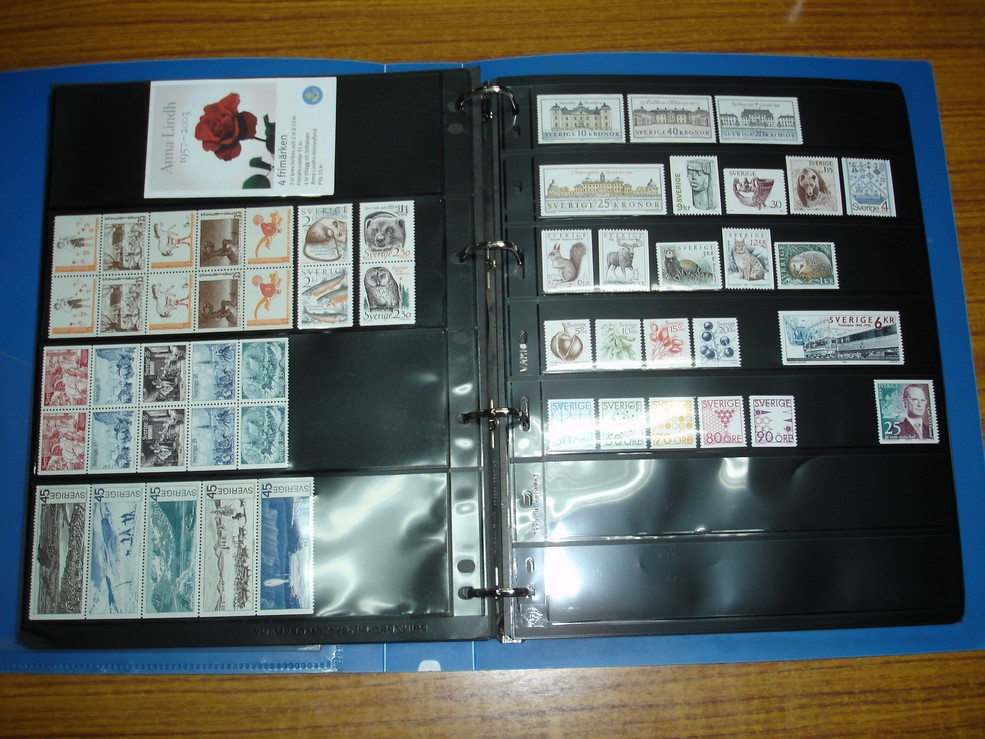
Ring-binder of loose-leaf stock pages storing stamp booklets and booklet panes

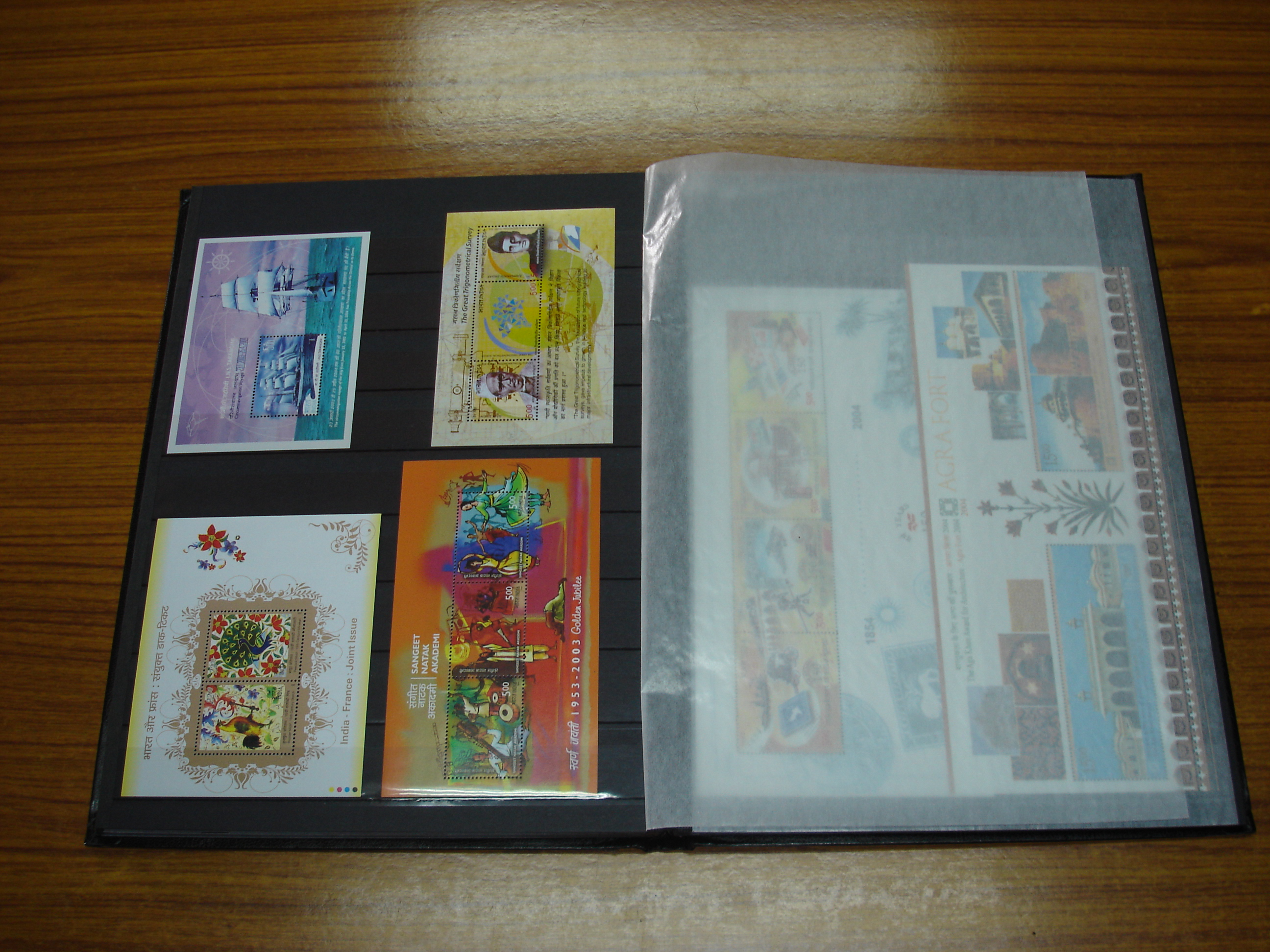
Stockbook with mint minisheets

== See also ==
- Philately
- Stamp album
- Stamp collecting
