= Regummed stamp =

Stamp with new gum applied

In philately, a regummed stamp is any stamp without gum, or without full gum, that has had new gum applied to the back to increase its value.

Unused stamps with full original gum (OG) on the back are worth more than stamps without gum or complete gum, for instance those that have been mounted using a stamp hinge.

Until the 1970s, it was common for stamps to be mounted using hinges and there was little difference in value between unmounted and previously hinged stamps. Since then, a significant price difference has developed between the two types of stamps and unscrupulous stamp collectors and dealers have been tempted to regum previously mounted stamps to make them appear as if they have full original gum.

Regumming may take place just to remove traces of mounting or to disguise more serious faults or repairs, in which case the whole stamp may be given new gum. Regumming to hide repaired faults is not new but regumming to remove traces of mounting is a relatively recent development.

== Detecting regummed stamps ==
Such alterations are often easily detected with the naked eye due to differences in colour or texture between the old and new gum. In addition, a stamp where all or a large part of the gum is fresh may sometimes be detected by placing it in the palm of the hand where warmth will cause the stamp to curl in a different direction to the same stamp with the original gum.

Another test is to use a magnifying glass to see if gum has gathered on the perforation edges of the stamp. This will not occur with an original gum stamp as the normal method of stamp production is to perforate a whole sheet of stamps after the sheet is first gummed and then printed. This means the gum is evenly distributed on the back of all the stamps contained on the sheet before perforating. The perforating process does not perfectly cut the paper. Fine tears develop along the round areas of the perforation edges because of this process. Also, when the stamps are torn to separate them from the sheets, fine tears along the perforation tips develop. These fine tears from perforating and tearing render tiny hairs descending from the edge of the stamp. Examination of these hairs will help detect a regummed stamp. With this test it is important not to look at the gum, but rather the perforation edges. The edges will be somewhat hairy on an original gummed stamp, but on a regummed stamp the hairs will be glued together in varying degrees. This gum may also gather unevenly at the perforation edges. On expert regumming jobs the person making the alteration may file the perforations to restore the original look to the stamps edge, but they almost always leave an imperfection or two that may only be caught by an expert.

If none of the normal tests are definitive then collectors will often obtain an opinion about the stamp's status from an expert, who will examine the stamp and may even analyse it chemically. This is known as having the stamp expertised.
