= Bund Philatelistischer Prüfer =

Association of philatelists

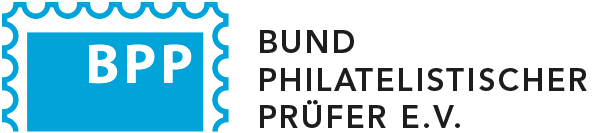
- Logo of the Bund Philatelistischer Prüfer (BPP)
- Abbreviation: BPP
- Founded: 1958
- Purpose: Philatelic examination and expertising
- Headquarters: Munich, Germany
- Official language: German
- President: Christian E. Geigle
- Website: www.bpp.de

Bund Philatelistischer Prüfer (the BPP, German for "Association of Philatelic Examiners") is the leading guild of philatelic examiners and expertisers in Germany.

Although antecedents can be found earlier, the BPP was founded in December 1958. The BPP is a member of the Bund Deutscher Philatelisten (Confederation of German philatelists). Members of the BPP are stamp expertisers who have areas of expertise in which each is accredited (for example, a member may be accredited to only give opinions and certificates on stamps from a particular issuing entity or for only a period of history).

When Germany unified in 1990, the BPP membership was joined by thirty experisers formerly located in East Germany. In 1993, the BPP introduced forgery-proof attestation and findings forms. Starting in 1994, the certification procedure was registered with the Association of German Chambers of Industry and Commerce ("IHK"). The BPP established a code of honour in 2000, followed by codified test standards in 2001 and a new test procedure in 2003.

Since 2006, the BPP has expanded its cooperation with the corresponding Austrian (VÖB) and Swiss (SBPV) associations.

In 2008, the BPP issued a four-volume series on the history of German philatelic examination and expertising, which was awarded the winner's prize, and at the stamp exhibition "London 2010 International Stamp Exhibition" with a gold medal.

As of 2016, the BPP had 103 active examiners, who issued roughly 30,000 certificates annually and a further 50,000 short examination reports.
