= Stamp album =

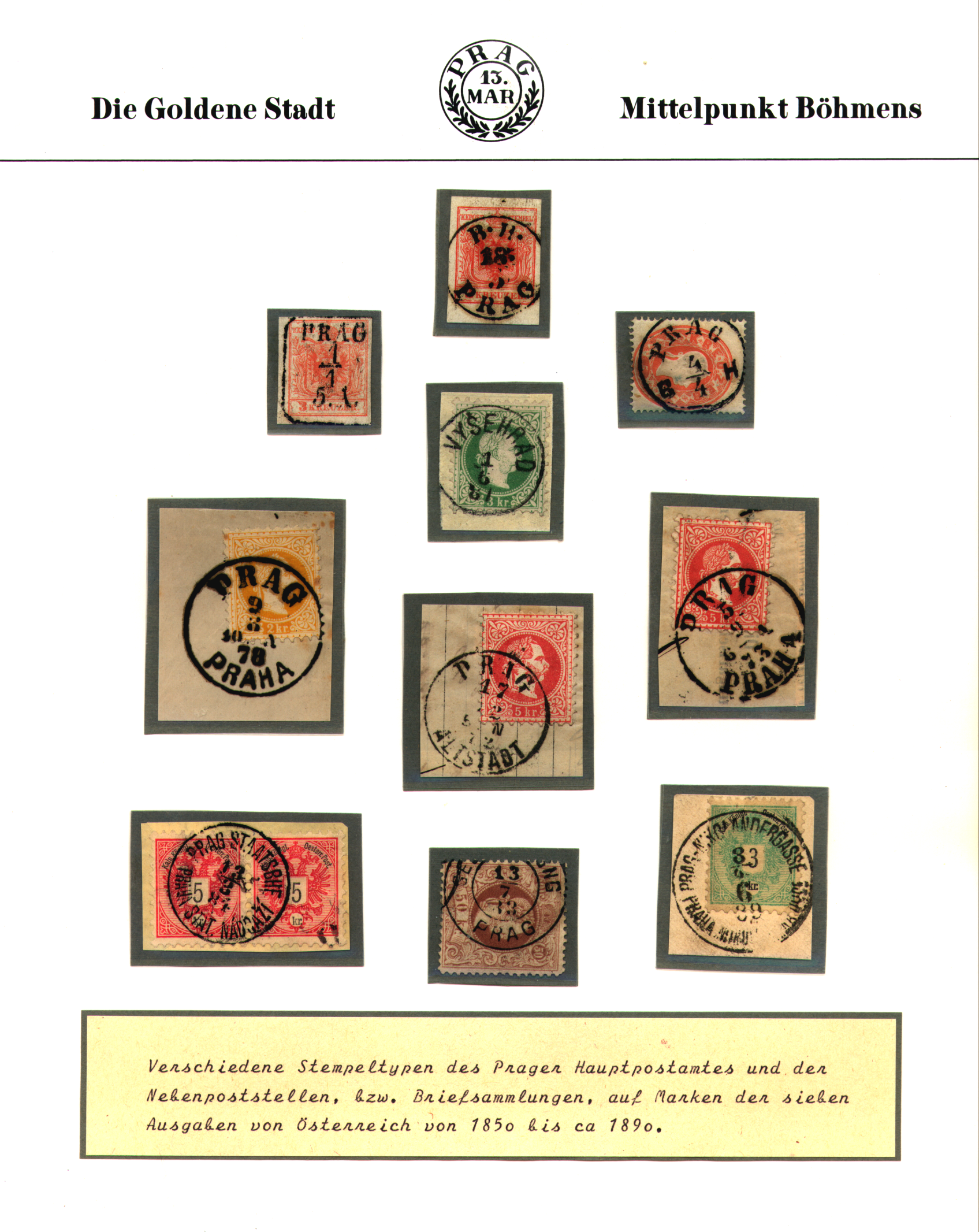
Customised stamp album page for a Marcophily collection of Prague postmarks

Stamp albums are books used to house a collection of postage stamps.

== Overview ==
Albums are a popular means of storing and displaying stamp collections for both beginners as well as accomplished collectors. They range from simple bound volumes intended to hold a fixed number of stamps to large multi-volumed collections with loose leafed pages to allow for expansion as the collection grows. Preprinted albums which are commercially available are the mainstay of the stamp collecting hobby. However, many collectors prefer the flexibility of laying out their own album pages.

== Preprinted albums ==
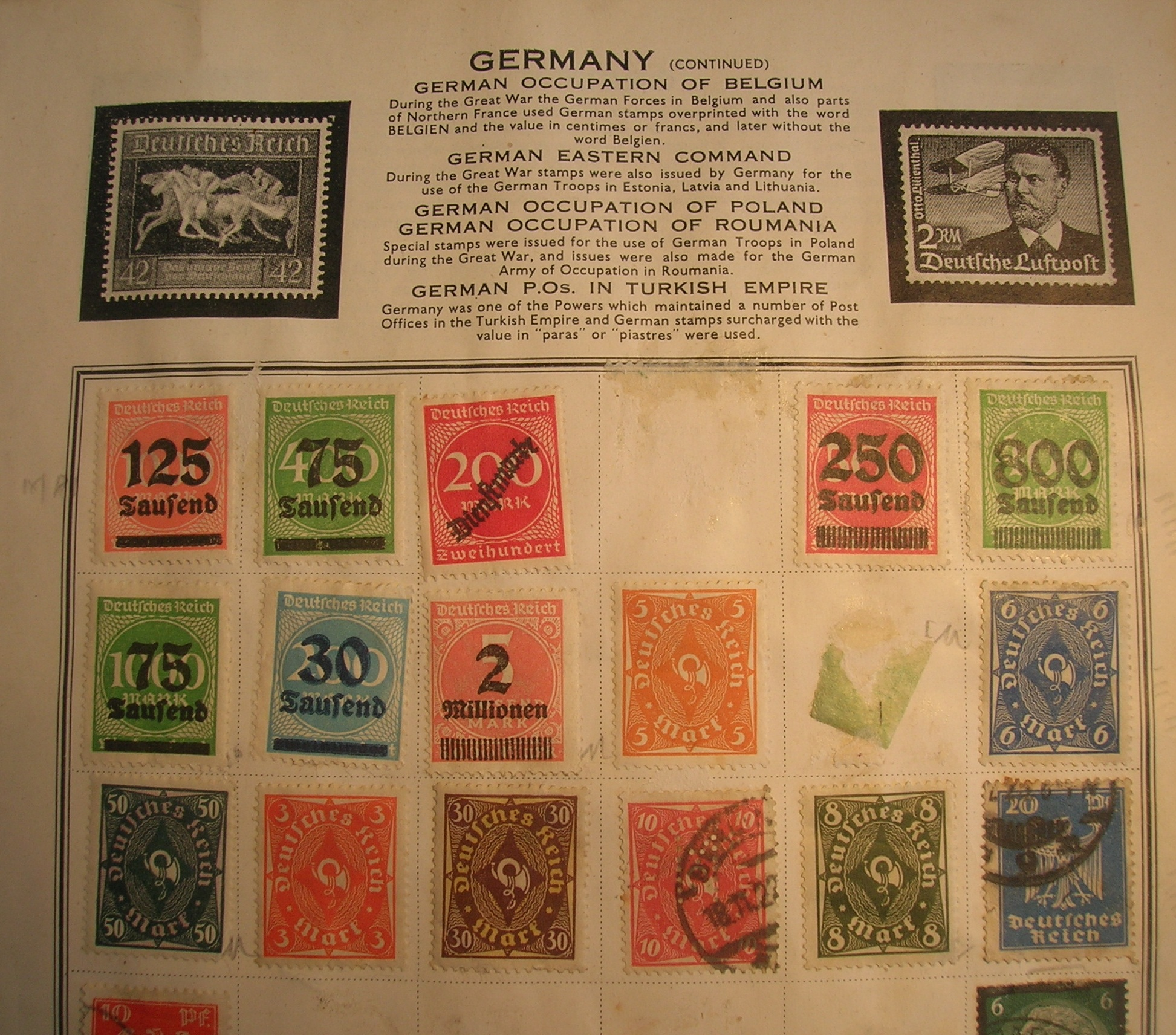
Preprinted page from a 1930s stamp album with printed spaces for non-specific mounting and includes information on each country

Many collectors buy preprinted albums and pages, which are produced by several manufacturers. The gamut ranges from worldwide albums, with only enough spaces for the common stamps and a few more, to one-country albums with spaces for every issued set and stamp. However these do not include variations that occur with an issue. The usual format is to print a black-and-white picture of the stamp in each space, reduced in size so that a real stamp will cover it up, and add a thin frame around the stamp. Captions range from minimal mentions of perforation or watermark, up to a paragraph giving a little background on the stamp's subject. Album pages are almost always one-sided; two-sided pages save space, but require interleaving sheets to prevent stamps from catching on each other. Pre-printed albums come in various formats where the collector can mount a used stamp with a hinge, create a pocket for the individual stamp using a pre-cut mount to stick to the page, or the easiest type called a "hingeless album" system where the pre-printed album page includes a place to put your postage stamp.

== Album layout ==
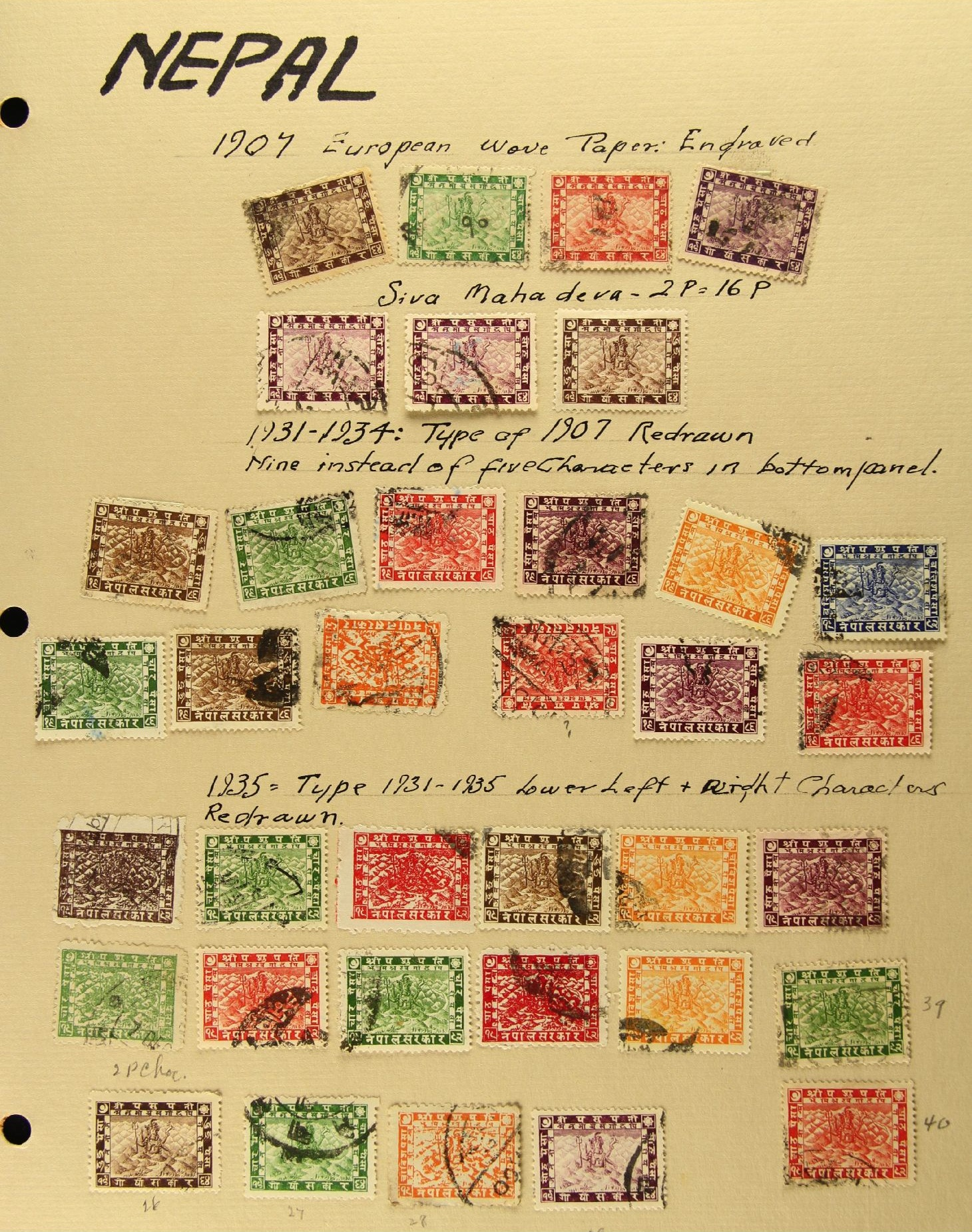
Simple handwritten album page with Nepalese Pashupati stamp collection

For ultimate flexibility, many collectors prefer to layout their own album pages. The arrangement of stamps on the page depends on the taste of the collector and the purpose of the collection. A collection with "one of each" stamp may have rows of stamps placed on each page, while a specialist's page might have a dozen examples of similar stamps, differing in watermarks, colour shades, perforations etc. Traditionally page creation has been done by hand using pen and ink; in recent years, however, with the advent of personal computers, home-printed pages have become popular. Ready to print album files may be found on the web, both free and commercial, or created by the collector using general-purpose software such as Microsoft Word or Scribus, or by means of a dedicated stamp album page layout program such as AlbumEasy and Album PageMaker.

== History ==
One of the first albums was the Stanley Gibbons “V.R.” published in the early 1870s. This was followed by the “Improved”, and then the illustrated “Imperial” albums. Present-day makers include Safe, Lighthouse (Leuchtturm), Lindner, Palo, Scott, and White Ace. Once collectors have started using a particular brand, they have a strong incentive to stay with it, and the manufacturers offer annual updates for the stamps issued during the previous year.

In the earliest albums, stamps were adhered to the pages, using either their own gum (as if put on an envelope) or glue. Stamp hinges were introduced soon after, allowing stamps to be removed without major damage to either the stamp or the album page. In the second half of the 20th century, stamp mounts were introduced. Mounts typically hold the stamp between two layers of plastic, with the front layer transparent, and are attached to an album page, allowing the stamp to be displayed without an adhesive touching the stamp. When properly used, mounts allow the stamp to be removed from the album in the same condition in which it was inserted. An album in which the mounts are affixed at the factory, either as mounts for individual stamps or as larger strips, is called "hingeless".

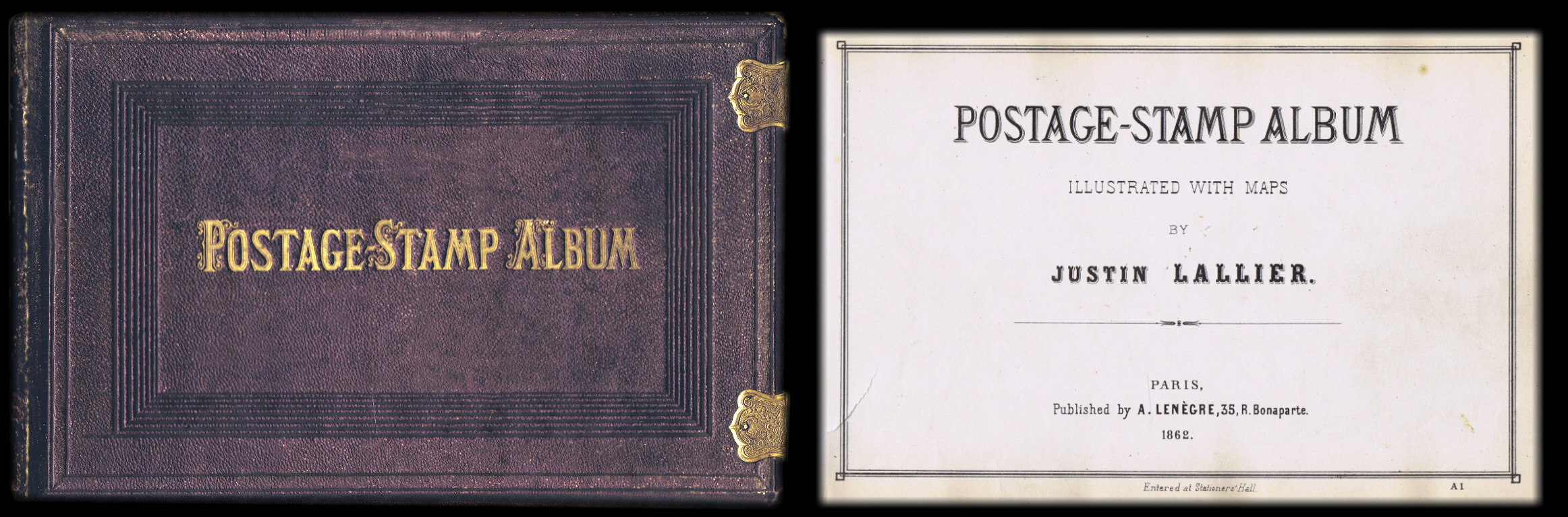
First Edition Lallier Postage Stamp Album 1862. World's first postage stamp album.

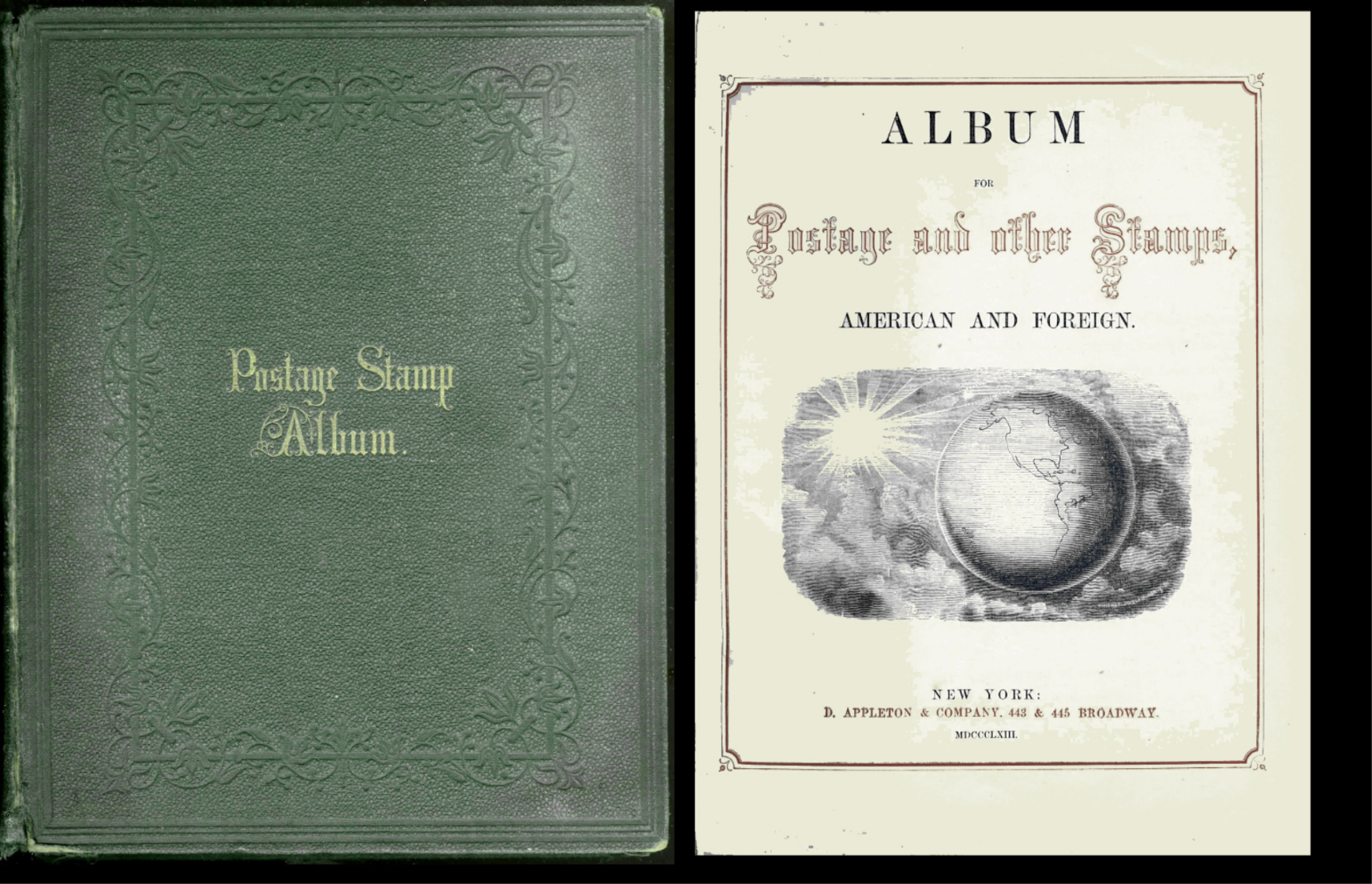
First American Postage Stamp Album published by Appleton 1863.

== Using albums ==
Better-quality albums have padded covers, which reduces possible pressure on the stamps exerted by adjacent albums on a shelf. Careful collectors do not cram albums tightly together, so as allow for a bit of air movement through the pages, and to prevent gum oozing or sticking.

== See also ==
- Stamp catalog
- Philately
- Stamp collecting
- Stockbook
