= Philately =

Study of stamps and postal history and other related items

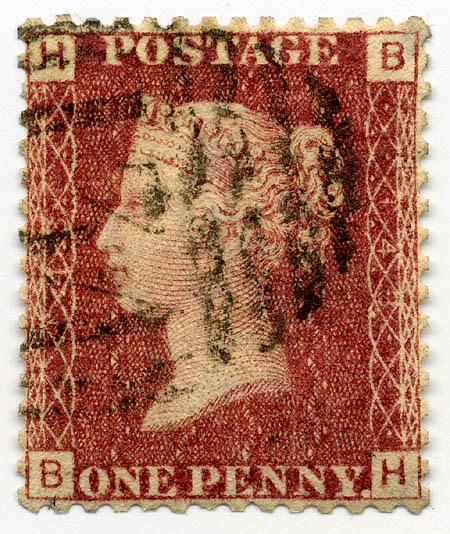
The Penny Red was used in the UK for many years (1841–1879), and comes in hundreds of variations which are subject to detailed study by philatelists.

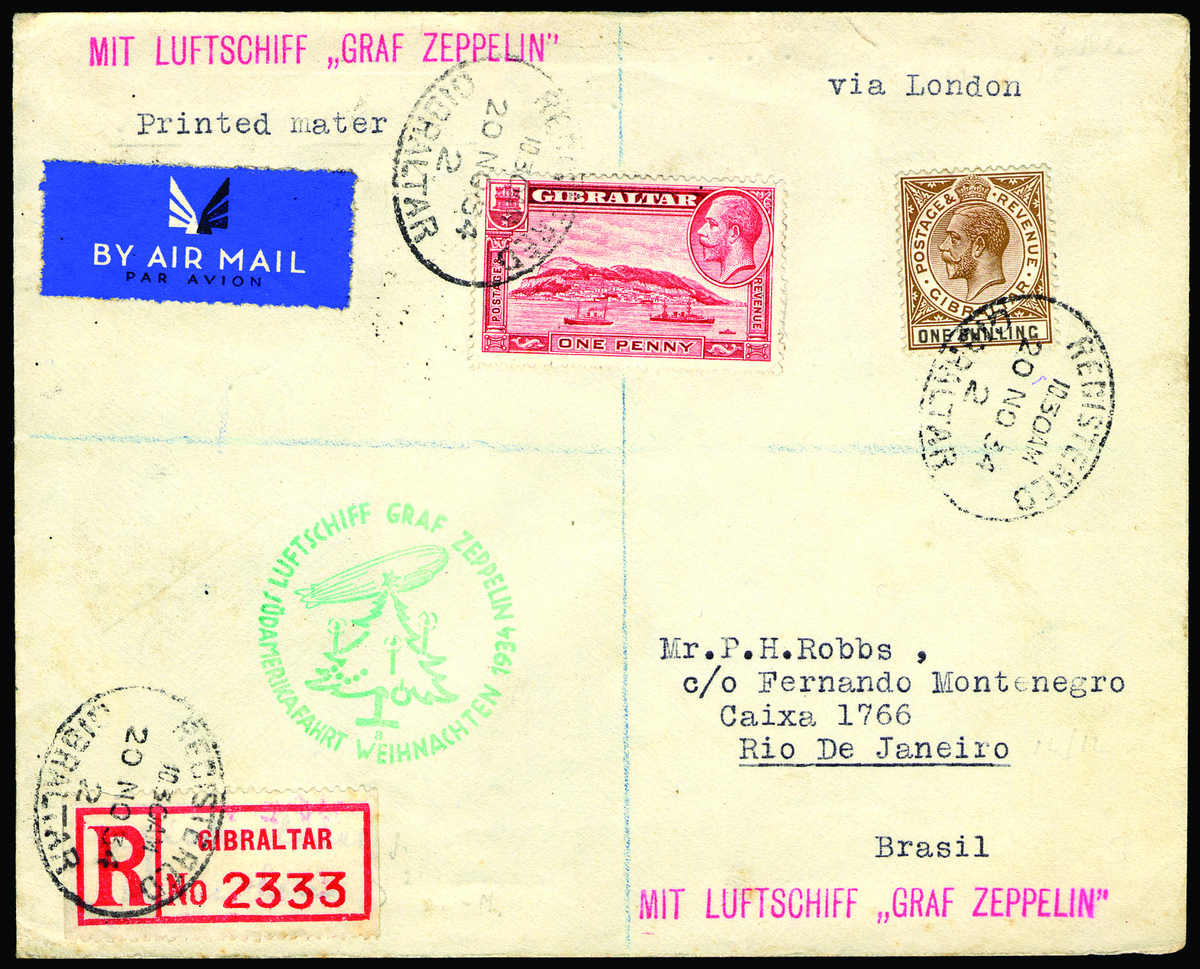
Zeppelin mail from Gibraltar to Rio de Janeiro, Brazil via Berlin on the Christmas flight (12th South American flight) of 1934

Philately (/fɪˈlætəli/; fih-LAT-ə-lee) is the study of postage stamps and postal history. It also refers to the collection and appreciation of stamps and other philatelic products. While closely associated with stamp collecting and the study of postage, it is possible to be a philatelist without owning any stamps. For instance, the stamps being studied may be very rare or reside only in museums.

== Etymology ==
The word "philately" is the English transliteration of the French "philatélie", coined by Georges Herpin in 1864. Herpin stated that stamps had been collected and studied for the previous six or seven years and a better name was required for the new hobby than timbromanie (roughly "stamp mania"), which was disliked. The alternative terms "timbromania", "timbrophily", and "timbrology" gradually fell out of use as philately gained acceptance during the 1860s. Herpin took the Greek root word φιλ(ο)- phil(o)-, meaning "an attraction or affinity for something", and ἀτέλεια ateleia, meaning "exempt from duties and taxes", to form the neologism "philatélie".

== History ==
=== Nineteenth century ===
As a collection field, philately appeared after the introduction of the postage stamps in 1840, but did not gain large attraction until the mid-1850s. In the U.S., early collectors of stamps were known as "stamp gatherers". The United States Post Office Department re-issued stamps in 1875 due to public demand for 'old stamps', including those from before the American Civil War. Some authors believe that the first philatelist appeared on the day of the release of the world's first postage stamp, dated to May 6th, 1840, when the Liverson, Denby and Lavie London law office sent a letter to Scotland franked with ten uncut Penny Blacks, stamped with the postmark "LS.6MY6. 1840." In 1992, at an auction in Zürich, this envelope was sold for 690,000 francs.

Already in 1846, cases of collecting stamps in large numbers were known in England. However, without reason for collection, stamps at this time were used for pasting wallpaper. The first philatelist is considered to be a postmaster going by the name Mansen, who lived in Paris, and in 1855 had sold his collection, which contained almost all the postage stamps issued by that time. The stamp merchant and second-hand book dealer Edard de Laplante bought it, recognizing the definitive collector's worth of the postage stamp. Due to the boom in popularity and news of this transaction, stamp merchants like Laplante began to emerge.

Towards the end of the 19th century, stamp collecting reached hundreds of thousands of people of all classes. Some countries had collections of postage stamps – for example, England, Germany, France, Bavaria, and Bulgaria. In countries which held national collections, museums dedicated to the nation's history with philately were founded, and the first such appeared in Germany, France, and Bulgaria. Allegedly, the first of these museums housed the collection of the British Museum, curated by MP Thomas Tapling and bequeathed to the Museum in 1891. The Museum für Kommunikation Berlin also had an extensive collection of stamps. The largest private collection of the time belonged to Philipp von Ferrary in Paris.

As the number of postage stamp issues increased every year, collection became progressively difficult. Therefore, from the early 1880s, "collector experts" appeared, specializing their collection to only one part of the world, a group of nations, or even only one.

=== Twentieth century ===
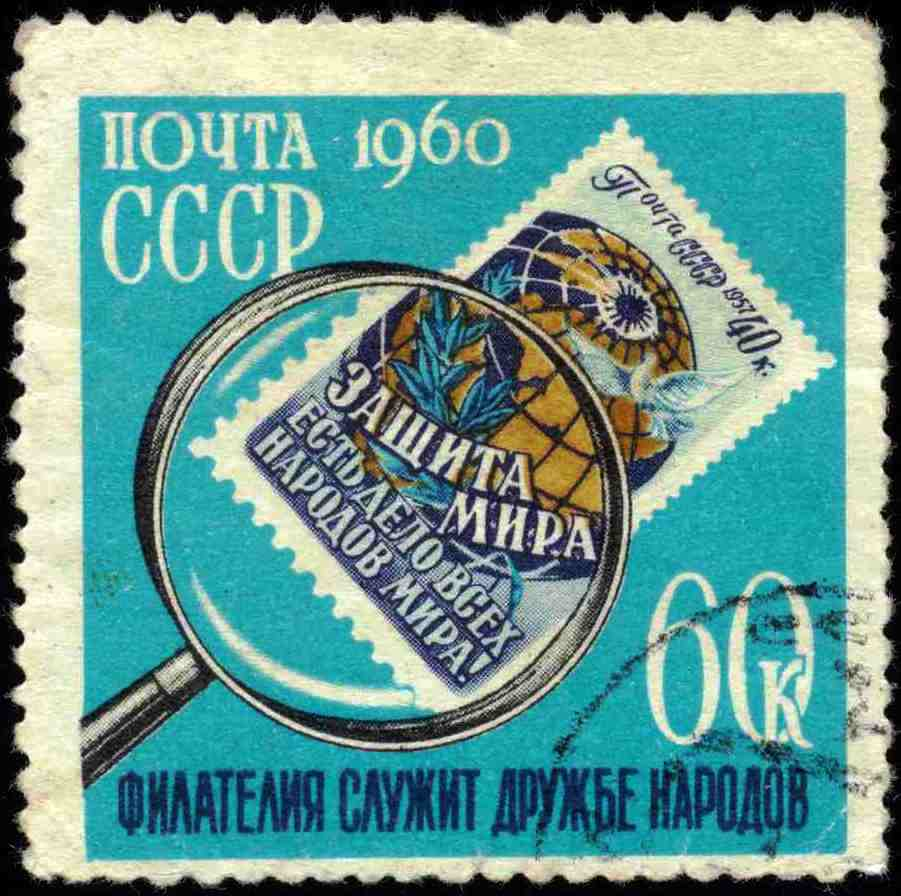
1960 Soviet stamp marking Collectors' Day: "Philately serves the friendship of peoples."

Philately as one of the most popular types of collecting continued to develop in the 20th century. Along with the "Scott", "Stanley Gibbons", and "Yvert et Tellier" catalogs, the "Zumstein" (first published in Switzerland, 1909), and the "Michel" (first published in Germany, 1910) catalogs began publication.

In 1934, the idea to celebrate an annual Postage Stamp Day was suggested by Hans von Rudolphi, a German philatelist. The idea was adopted rapidly in Germany, and gained later adoption in other countries. Stamp Day is a memorial day established by the postal administration of a country and annually celebrated, which is designed to attract public attention to, popularize the use of, and expand the reach of postal correspondence, and contribute to the development of philately. In 1968, Cuba dedicated a postage stamp for Stamp Day with an image of G. Sciltian's "El filatelista".

In 1926, the Fédération Internationale de Philatélie (FIP) was founded, where international philatelic exhibitions have been regularly organized since 1929. The first World Philatelic Exhibition in Prague was held between August and September 1962; in 1976, the FIP brought together national societies from 57 countries, which held over 100 exhibitions, and in 1987, over 60 countries entered the FIP.

Since the middle of the 20th century, philately has become the most widespread field of amateur collecting, which was facilitated by:

- significantly expanded postal exchanges between countries,
- many countries' post offices issuing:
  - Cinderella stamps,
  - commemorative emissions,
  - multicolor series of stamps devoted to history, the most important events of our time, art, fauna, flora, sports, etc. .;
  - individual stamps, sheets (a sheet with one or more printed stamps and inscription on the margins) and items intended specifically for philatelists;
- widespread sale of collection signs of postage (including commissioned ones), albums, stockbooks and other items of philately;
- publication of stamp catalogs;
- national and international exhibitions organized by philatelic societies, domestic and international exchanges, philately propaganda through specialized magazines and other periodicals.

Philately magazines, at this time, were published as far east as Poland, and as far west as North America. In Canada, Canadian Stamp News was established in 1976 as an off-shoot to Canadian Coin News, which was launched about a decade earlier.

Philately was largely advanced by the USSR and nations within its sphere of influence, and the United States, France, the UK, and Austria. The British Library Philatelic Collections and the postal museums in Stockholm, Paris, and Bern had unique national philately collections at that time, and among the famous private collections are those of the Royal Philatelic Collection, F. Ferrari (Austria), M. Burrus (Switzerland), A. Lichtenstein, A. Hind, J. Boker (U.S.), and H. Kanai (Japan).

In the mid-1970s, national philately organizations and associations existed in most countries, and 150–200 million people were involved in philately.

=== Twenty-first century ===
From 28 August to 1 September 2004, the World Stamp Championship was held for the first time in the history of world philately in Singapore.

== Types ==
Traditional philately is the study of the technical aspects of stamp production and stamp identification, including:

- The stamp design process
- The paper used (wove, laid and including watermarks)
- The method of printing (engraving, typography)
- The gum
- The method of separation (perforation, rouletting)
- Any overprints on the stamp
- Any security markings, underprints or perforated initials ("perfins")
- The study of philatelic fakes and forgeries

== Diversification ==
Expanding range of activity:

- Thematic philately, also known as topical philately, is the study of what is depicted on individual stamps. There are hundreds of popular subjects, such as birds, and ships, poets, presidents, monarchs, maps, aircraft, spacecraft, sports, and insects on stamps. Stamps depicted on stamps also constitute a topical area of collecting. Interesting aspects of topical philately include design mistakes and alterations; for instance, the recent editing out of cigarettes from the pictures used for United States stamps, and the stories of how particular images came to be used.
- Postal history studies the postal systems and how they operate and, or, the study of postage stamps and covers and associated material illustrating historical episodes of postal systems both before and after the introduction of the adhesive stamps. It includes the study of postmarks, post offices, postal authorities, postal rates and regulations and the process by which letters are moved from sender to recipient, including routes and choice of conveyance. A classic example is the Pony Express, which was the fastest way to send letters across the United States during the few months that it operated. Covers that can be proven to have been sent by the Pony Express are highly prized by collectors.
- Aerophilately is the branch of postal history that specializes in the study of airmail. Philatelists have observed the development of mail transport by air from its beginning, and all aspects of airmail services have been extensively studied and documented by specialists.
- Astrophilately is the branch of postal history that specializes in the study of stamps and postmarked envelopes that are connected to outer space.
- Postal stationery includes stamped envelopes, postal cards, letter sheets, aérogrammes (airletter sheets) and wrappers, most of which have an embossed or imprinted stamp or indicia indicating the prepayment of postage.
- Erinnophilia is the study of objects (cinderella stamps) that look like stamps, but are not postage stamps. Examples include Easter Seals, Christmas Seals, propaganda labels, and so forth.
- Philatelic literature documents the results of the philatelic study and includes thousands of books and periodicals.
- Revenue philately is the study of stamps used to collect taxes or fees on such things as legal documents, court fees, receipts, tobacco, alcoholic drinks, drugs and medicines, playing cards, hunting licenses and newspapers.
- Maximaphily is the study of Maximum Cards. Maximum Cards can be defined as a picture postcard with a postage stamp on the same theme and cancellation, with a maximum concordance between all three.
- Letterlocking includes "the process of folding and securing of letter substrates to become their own envelopes" or to create a form of "tamper-evident locking mechanism."

== Tools ==
Philately uses several tools, including stamp tongs (a specialized form of tweezers) to safely handle the stamps, a strong magnifying glass and a perforation gauge (odontometer) to measure the perforation gauge of the stamp.

The identification of watermarks is equally important and may be done with the naked eye by turning the stamp over or holding it up to the light. If this fails then watermark fluid may be used, which "wets" the stamp to reveal the mark.

Other common tools include stamp catalogs, stamp stock books and stamp hinges.

== Organizations ==
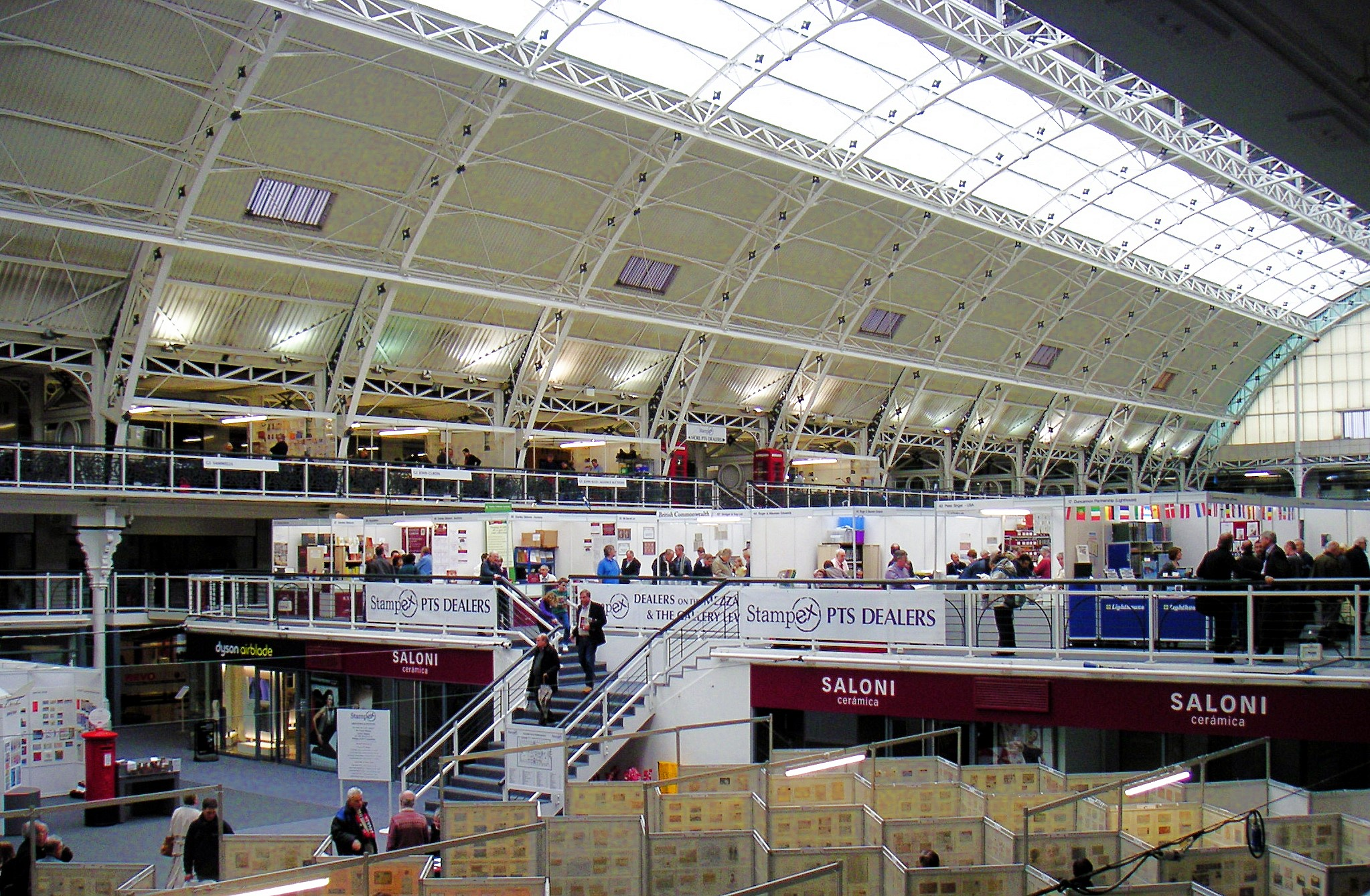
A large stamp show (philatelic exhibition) at which collectors and dealers meet

Philatelic organizations sprang up soon after people started collecting and studying stamps. They include local, national and international clubs and societies where collectors come together to share the various aspects of their hobby.

The world's oldest philatelic society is the Royal Philatelic Society London, which was founded on 10 April 1869, as the Philatelic Society. In North America, the major national societies include the American Philatelic Society; the Royal Philatelic Society of Canada; and the Mexico-Elmhurst Philatelic Society, International.

Local clubs and societies have been established in many cities of the world. The International Philatelic Federation was formed in 1926 which is originally based in Zürich, Switzerland but is now known to be the world federation for philately.

== See also ==
- List of notable postage stamps
- List of philatelic awards
- List of philatelic topics
- List of philatelists
- Numismatics – Study of currencies, coins and paper money
- Postal museum – Type of museum focused on the history of postal services
