= Stamp hinge =

Adhesive used for stamp collecting

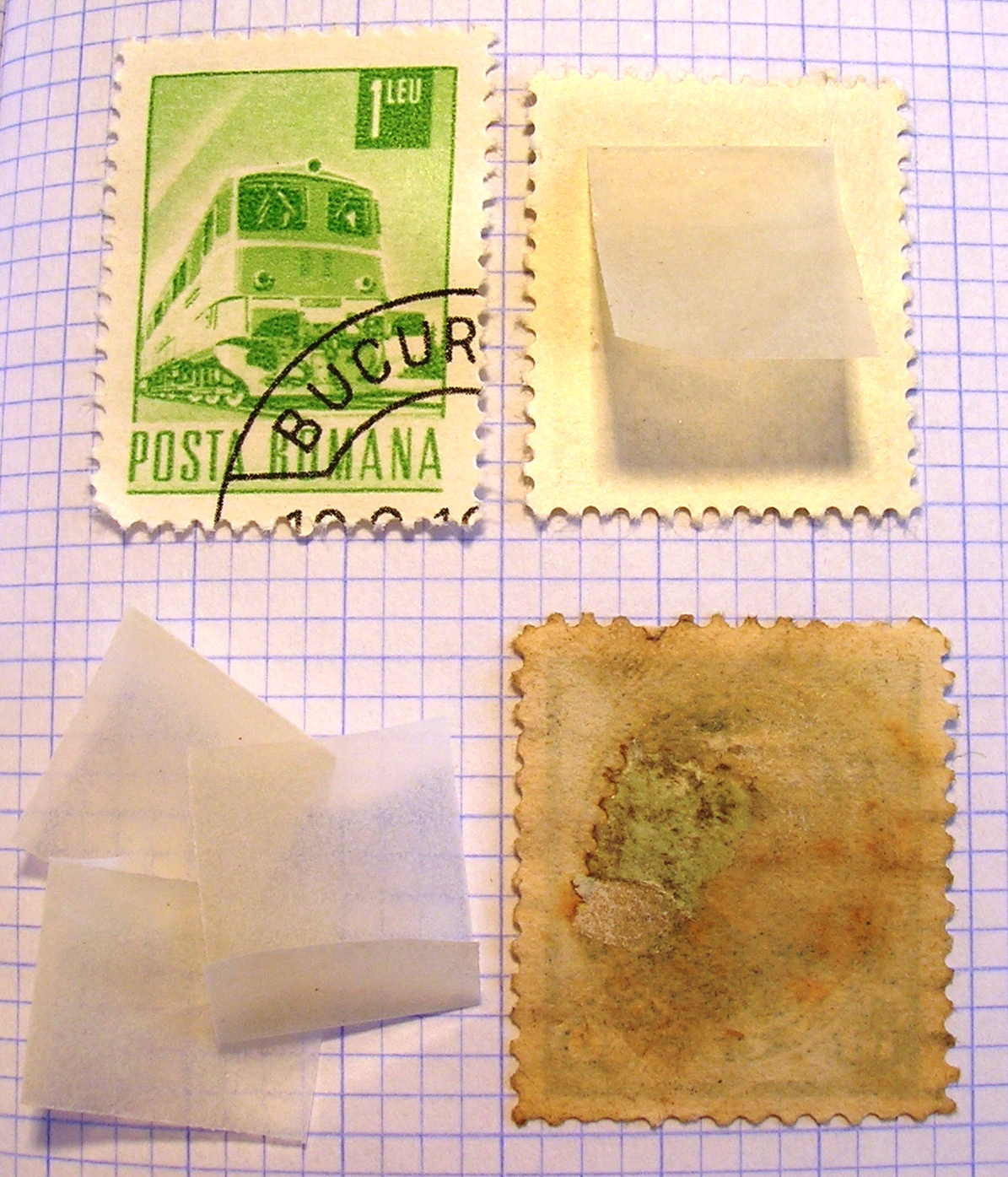
Clockwise from top left, we see a hinge-mounted stamp, stamp about to be hinge-mounted, stamp damaged by a hinge, and loose stamp hinges

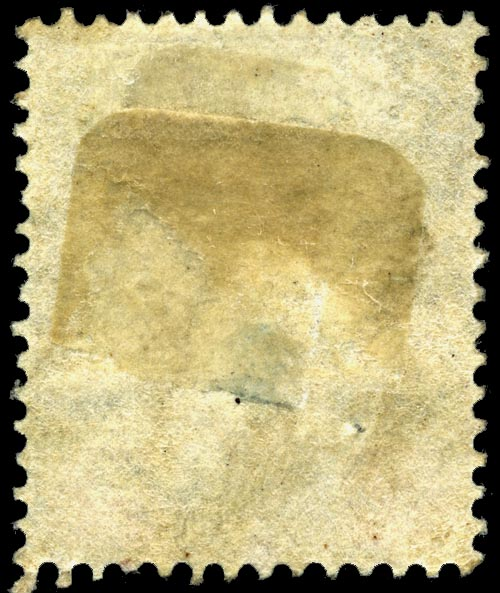
Multiple hinge remnants are visible on the back of this stamp.

In philately, stamp hinges, or mounts, are small, folded, transparent, rectangular pieces of paper coated with a mild gum. They are used by stamp collectors to affix postage stamps onto the pages of a stamp album.

== Use ==
The short end is moistened and affixed to the stamp, the long end is likewise affixed to the page. The hinge keeps the stamp on the page while still allowing it to be lifted to examine the back, for instance to see the watermark or expert marks.

== Abbreviation ==
Collectors categorise their stamps as follows:

- MUH/MNH – Mint Unhinged/Never Hinged
- H – Hinged
- LH – Lightly Hinged
- HH – Heavily Hinged
- HR – Hinge Remnant (portion of the hinge could not be removed and remains on the stamp)

== Risks ==
The best stamp hinges are designed to be "peelable", meaning that the stamp may be removed from the page, and the hinge from the stamp, without damage to either. Not all makers of hinge have this property, and the backs of many stamps have "hinge remnants", where the hinge has torn away rather than releasing the stamp. This is especially common for mint stamps, where the stamp's own gum adheres tightly to the hinge. Some old stamps may have multiple hinge remnants layered on top of each other. Conversely, careless removal of a hinge may take away a layer of the stamp's paper, resulting in a type of stamp thin known as a hinge thin. The thinner paper will be noticeable when the stamp is held up to the light and is considered a serious fault in a stamp.

Even with the use of peelable hinges and care to minimize the moisture used, the hinge will leave a visible disturbance in the gum of an unused stamp. While this was formerly a matter of indifference, since about the middle of the 20th century many collectors have come to prefer "unhinged stamps" showing no trace of hinging.

Collectors preferring unhinged stamps typically use pocket-like or sleeve-like hingeless mounts, often for higher-value or unused stamps.

== Re-gumming ==
Since the time that unhinged stamps became popular, considerable numbers of old stamps with intact gum have appeared on the market, raising suspicion that many of these have been regummed.
