= Philatelic expertisation =

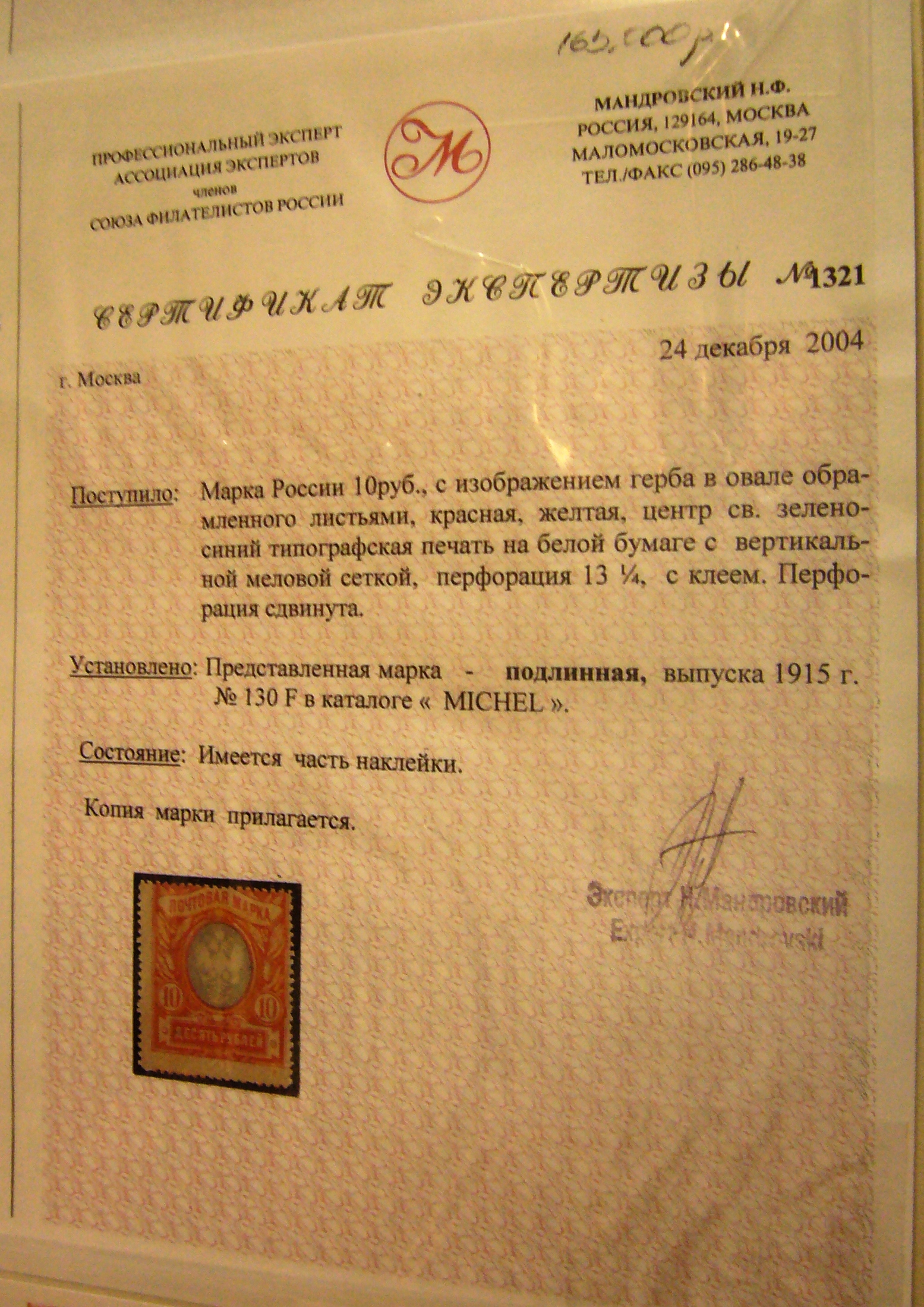
Expertization certificate issued in 2004 for a 1915 Russian 10 ruble postage stamp

Philatelic expertisation is the process whereby an authority is asked to give an opinion whether a philatelic item is genuine and whether it has been repaired or altered in any way.

Forging and faking, regumming and reperforating of stamps is common in the philatelic marketplace, and increasingly buyers demand an expert certificate before buying a valuable item. Some items are so often faked or altered that they may be almost unsaleable without a certificate.

== Expert certificates and marks ==
Stamp expertisation mark of Alfred Forbin

Once an item has been examined, the expert(s) will issue a certificate giving their findings which will include identification, genuineness or otherwise and comments about any alterations or unusual features. The certificate will normally feature a photograph of the item and be signed. It may also be embossed or have other security features. In the past it was common for experts to sign or add their mark to the back of stamps, however, this is nowadays uncommon as it is by some regarded as an undesired alteration. In Germany (BPP) it is still common practise to sign many items, but generally not the most valuable.

There have been instances where expert certificates have themselves been faked and in the "Blüm Case", a forger produced false expertizing marks that were applied to German colony stamps and others.

== Finding experts ==
In the United States, the Philatelic Foundation, American Philatelic Society and numerous specialized stamp collecting organizations have committees who will perform expertisation for a fee. In Great Britain The Royal Philatelic Society London has a renowned expert committee which is also the oldest in the world, and of equal fame is the BPA expert committee. German experts usually belong to the Bund Philatelistischer Prüfer (BPP). Specialized in their countries issues are e.g. the expert committees of NVPH (Netherlands), COMEX (Spain), Isphila (Turkey). - In addition, the International Association of Philatelic Experts (AIEP) is a worldwide organisation for independent stamp experts.

The results of expertisation may be challenged, and in some cases further research has shown the genuineness of an item considered a forgery, or vice versa.

== See also ==
- Expertisation
- Philatelic fakes and forgeries
