= Hermes (Greek stamp) =

1860 postage stamp of the Kingdom of Greece

The Greek god Hermes was the representation chosen in 1860 by the Kingdom of Greece to illustrate its first postal stamps.

The first type, the "Large Hermes Head" (LHH), was issued in October 1861, and stayed in circulation up to 1886. It was then replaced by the second type, the "small Hermes head". The "large Hermes head" stamps were reissued and overprinted in 1900 and 1901 in order to mitigate the delay of shipment of the stamps of the third type, the "flying Hermes" by the British printer J. P. Segg & Co.

In 1896, Hermes is used on one of the values of the 1896 Olympics Games emission.

In 1902, a fourth type showing Hermes effigy was issued for international "metal payment".

Finally, in 1912, a fifth type showing various representations of Hermes was issued and stayed in circulation up to 1926.

Starting early 1920s, the subjects used to illustrate the Greek postal stamps were diversified and let down the Hermes effigy.

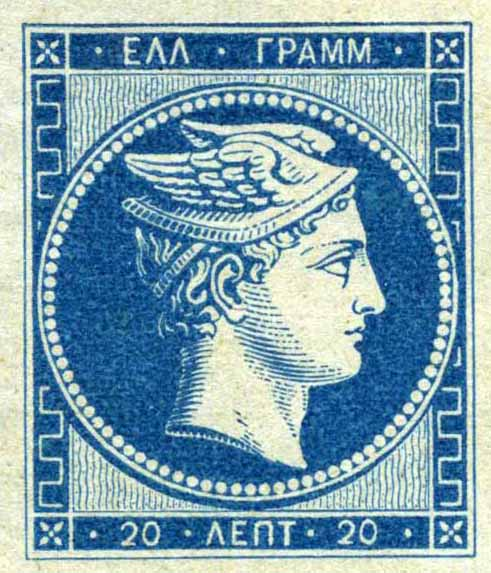
20 lepta of the "large Hermes head" of the Paris printings

== The "large Hermes head" (1860–1901) ==
The postal stamps of the "large Hermes head" type were issued in application of the law of May 19, 1855, which set forth the details of the organization of the postal service and the introduction of the postage stamp. Enacted by the Royal Decree of May 8, 1858, it was published on December 31, 1859, but never brought into effect. A new bill defining, among other things, the rates, denominations, and colors of the seven denominations of the first Greek postage stamp was: introduced on February 8, 1860; passed on May 21, 1860; published in the Official Gazette on August 17, 1861; and enacted by Royal Decree on September 21, 1861

The stamps depict a profile of the Greek messenger god Hermes (syncretized by the Romans as Mercury) in a frame strongly resembling that used for contemporary stamps of France.

The seven first values of the stamps of the "large Hermes head" were printed for more than twenty years (from 1861 to 1882.) They were derived from the same seven typographic plates and stayed in circulation for 25 years (from 1861 to 1886) before being used again, overprinted, in 1900–1901.
The first set was issued on October 1, 1861. It consisted of seven denominations (1 lepton, 2, 5, 10, 20, 40 & 80 lepta).
The 30 & 60 lepta values were introduced in 1876 for the U.G.P. (ancestor of the U.P.U.) and for the harmonization of the international mail rates.

The "large Hermes head" stamps are non perforated, with the exception of the two overprinted sets of 1900–1901, in imperforate sheets of 150 stamps. The individual stamps were separated at the counter using scissors, resulting in defects in a large proportion of them (cutting off part of the image). However unofficial perforations were produced locally. The most commonly found is the so-called Athens perforation (11½).

=== The mock-up, the dies, the die-proofs and the plate-proofs (1860 and 1861) ===
The drawing of the mock-up, the engraving of the dies as well as the manufacturing of the typographic plates of the first seven values have been realised between July 1860 and September 1861 by the Chief Engraver of the Paris Mint: Désiré-Albert Barre (1818–1878).

For the creation of the first Greek stamp, Désiré-Albert Barre was inspired by the two first stamp types of France designed from 1848 by his father, Jacques-Jean Barre: the "République" and "Présidence" types also named "Cérès" and "Napoléon".

Désiré-Albert Barre started by engraving the necessary dies for the manufacturing of the typographic plates. As an engraver and to validate his work, he printed four types of die-proofs, two types of progressive die-proofs and two types of final die-proofs.

Then the Chief-Engraver manufactured also the seven typographic plates of the first seven values of the "large Hermes head", using the method developed in 1858–1859 and validated with the plates-proofs, "Cérès 1858": the "direct striking in the coining press" method. The large Hermes Heads are the only stamps which have ever been printed with typographic plates manufactured with this method.

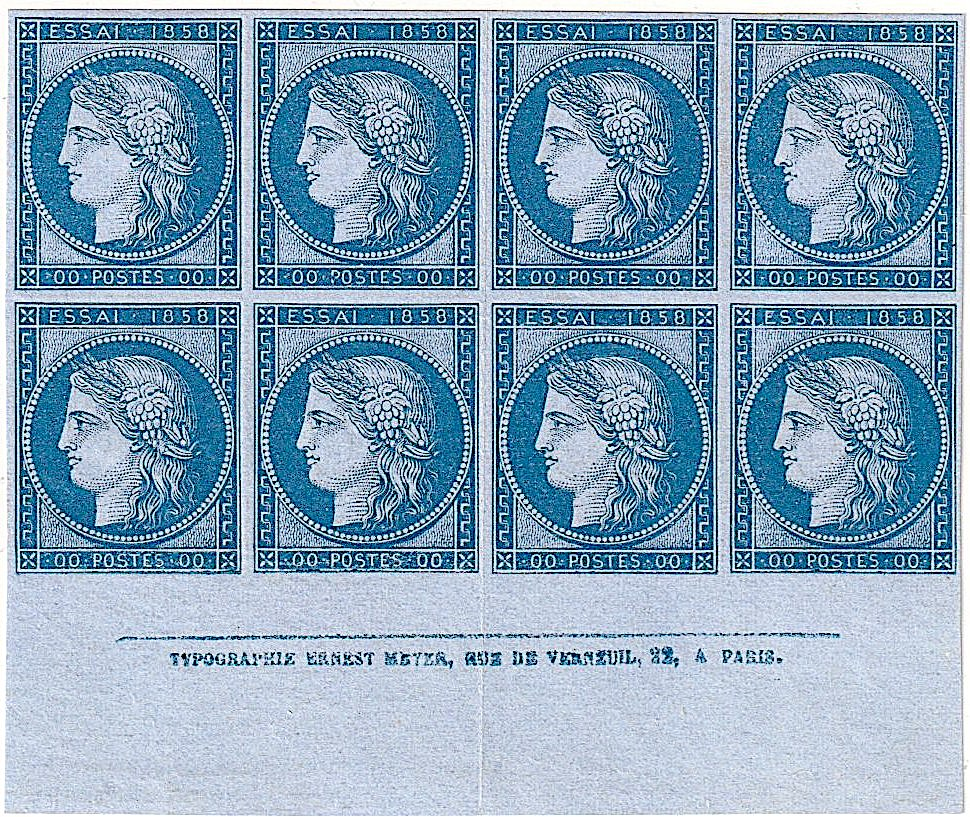
Block of 8 of the "Cérès 1858"
plate-proof with "control numbers"
Recto

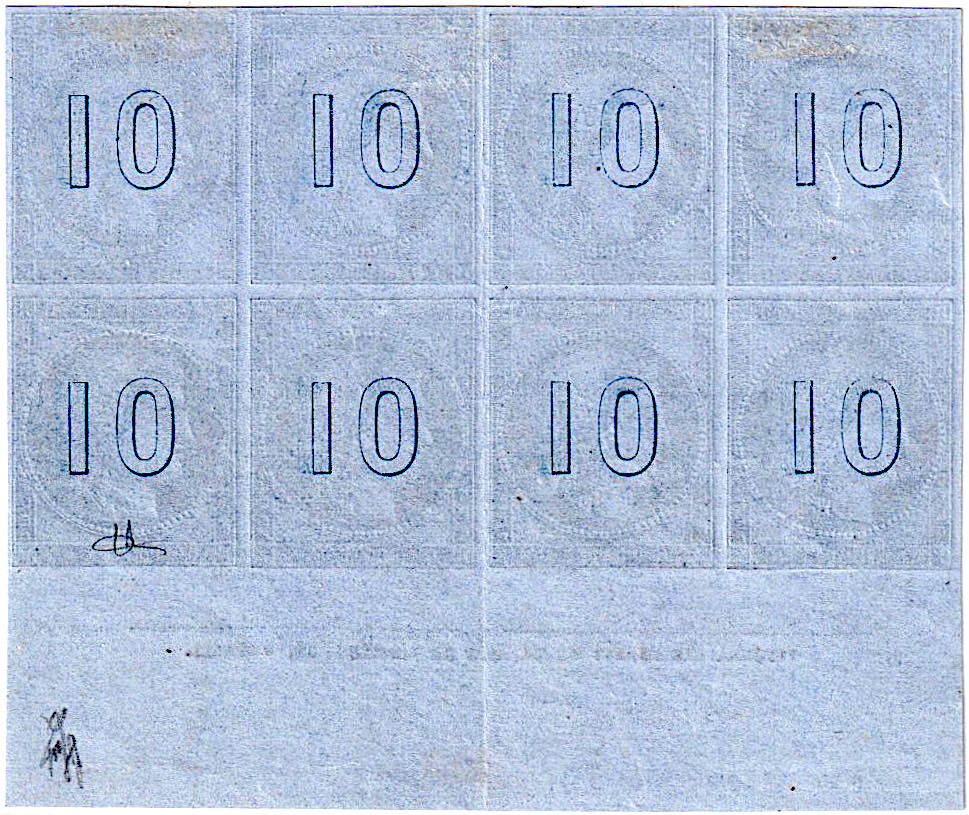
Block of 8 of the "Cérès 1858"
plate-proof with "control numbers"
Verso

See the Louis Fanchini study : The essays "Cérès 1858": Why are they an integral part of the Greek philately? in Philotelia n° 652/653 & 654 of September/October, November/December 2008 & January/February 2009, pp. 260–270, 364–374 & 7–16 and visible on the Lou Basel web site: https://web.archive.org/web/20151002141114/http://hermesheads.home.comcast.net/~hermesheads/.

To determine the choice of the inks and the papers and as well to calibrate the printing press, Désiré-Albert Barre realized, with the printer Ernest Meyer, about a hundred of different types of plate-proofs and imprimaturs for all the values.

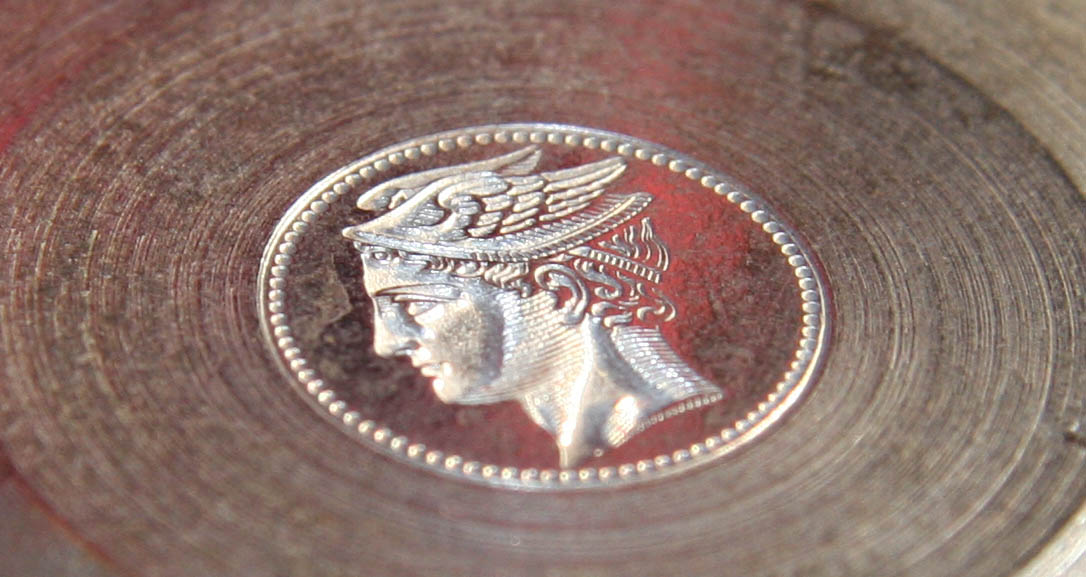
The original medallion die
(détail)

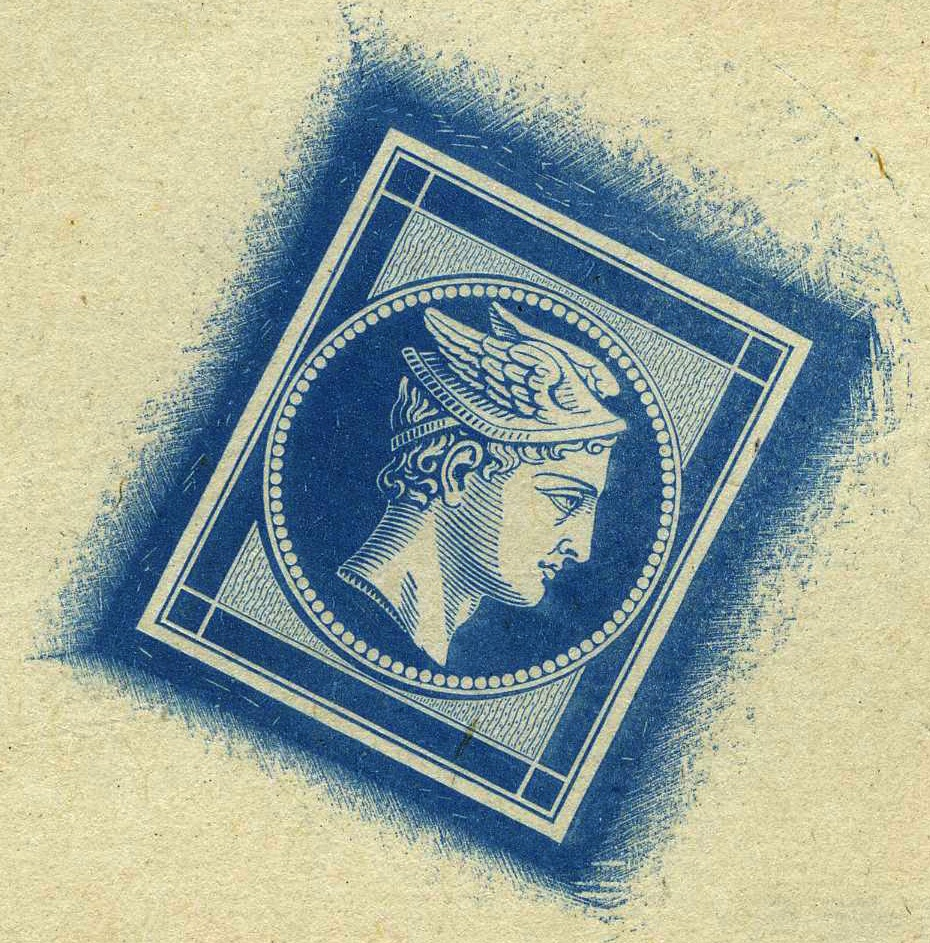
Progressive die-proof
(détail)

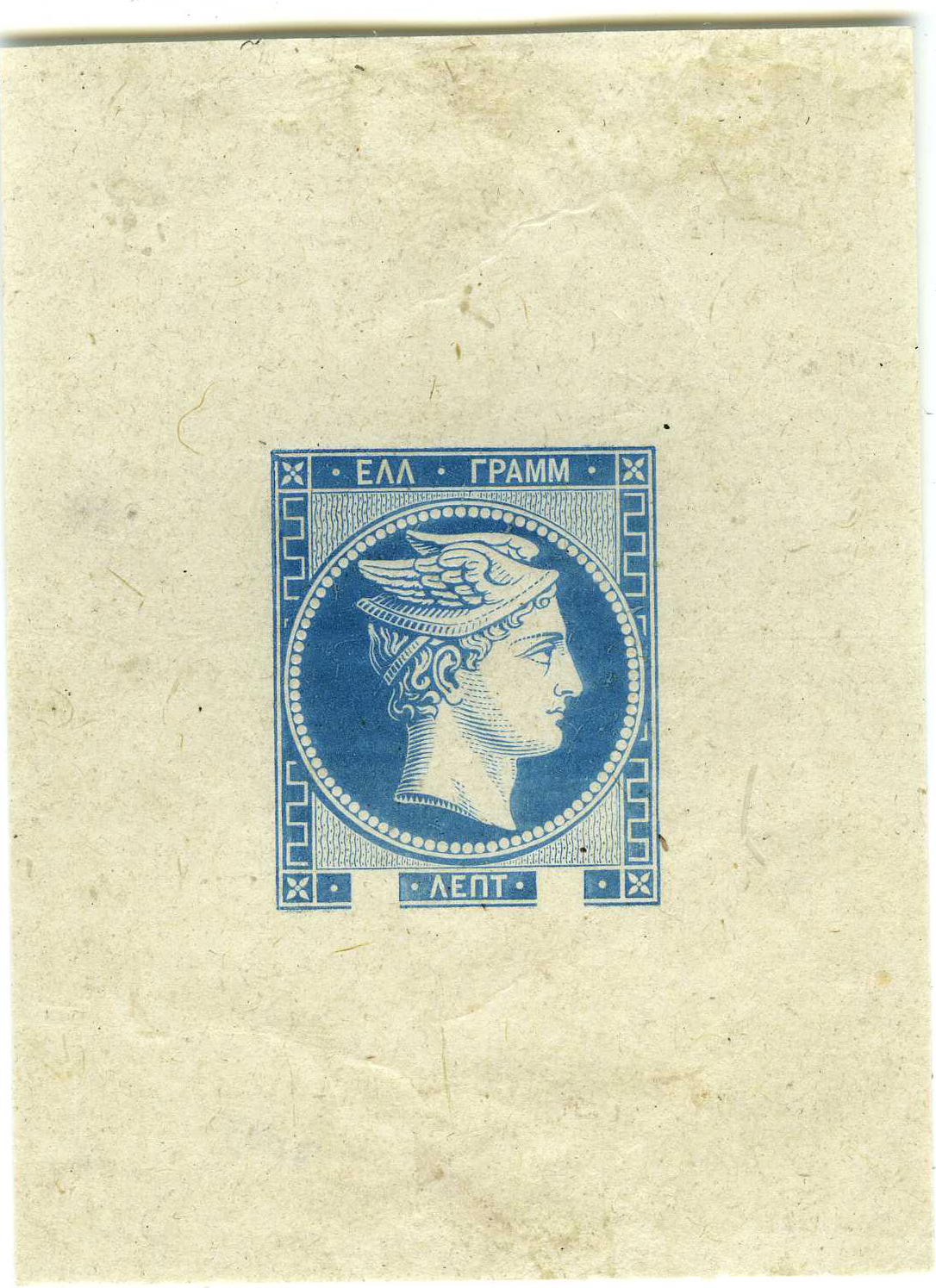
Final die-proof without values, in blue

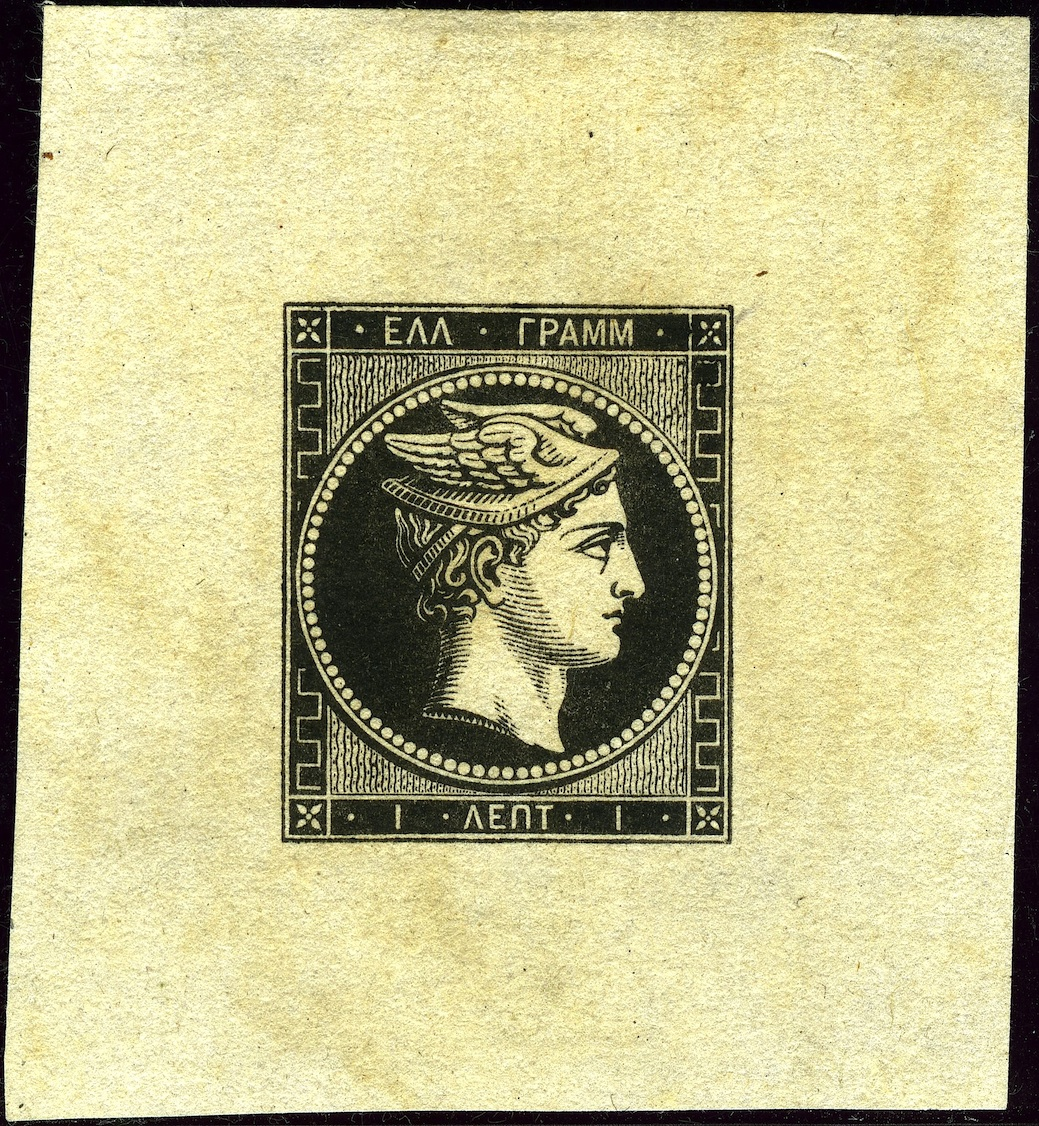
The unique 1 lepton numbered final die-proof

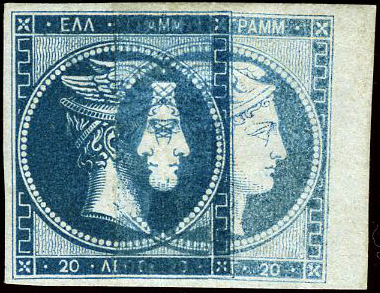
20 lepta plate-proof
Triple printing

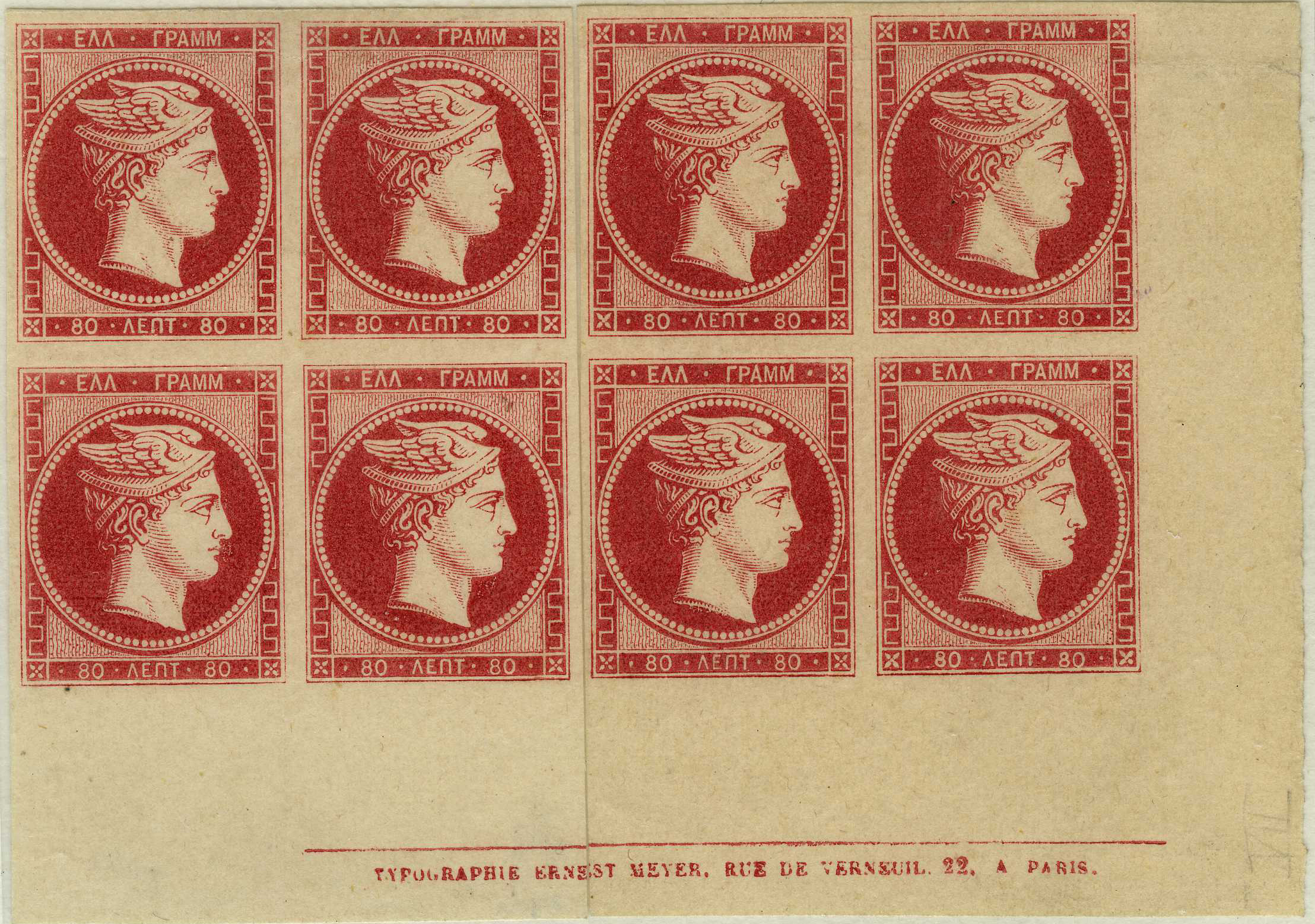
80 lepta imprimatur with
the inscription of the printer Ernest Meyer

==== Classification of the Large Hermes Heads ====
1.345.000 stamps of the 7 first values have been printed in Paris during spring/summer 1861 (see chapter on Paris printings below). In August & September 1861 the printing plates were transferred to Athens and subsequent printings were made there, at the National Printing Office (Mint). The same plates remained in use up to 1882, resulting in a huge number of varieties and shades due to plates becoming worn and then cleaned, changes in the exact method of printing and using several different kinds of paper...

If Paris printings are easily recognizable, the classification of the Athens printings is not always easy and there are substantial differences between the various catalogues and specialized publications.

The first classifications came at the turn of the 19th/20th centuries by:

- Arthur E. Glasewald, (Gössnitz, Germany)
- Yvert et Tellier, (Amiens, France),
- the Manchester school, UK (Walter Dorning Beckton, Percival Loines Pemberton, Theodore Groom...),
- Crawford Capen, (New York, USA),
- Alfred Montader, (Paris France),
- Georges Brunel, (Paris, France),
- N. S. Nicolaïdès, (Paris France),
- J. Briault & Nikolaos Garas, (La Celle Saint Cloud, France),
- Paul de Smeth, (Amiens, France).

These studies have been completed and largely enhanced by:

- Alexandros. G. Argyropoulos and Dr. Herbert Mund in Griechenland. In: Kohl Briefmarken-Handbug, Berlin 1929/1931, and
- Tryphon Constantinidès, in Etude sur les timbres-poste de la Grèce - 1ère Partie, Hellenic Philatelic Society Athens 1933, witch is still considered as the "bible" of the classification of the LHH of Greece.

Numerous studies and classification have been published throughout the 20th & the 21st centuries... Just to mention some of main ones:

- Pullen,,
- Deïlakis,
- The stamp Specialist (Blue Book),
- Billig's Specialized Catalogues,
- Dimitris Papitsis,
- ...

Starting the 1960s and up to the end of the century, Orestis Vlastos catalogues were the reference for the LHH community.

At the beginning of 21st century, Michel Tseriotis has established, including the work of John G. Coundouros, a classification which is well accepted and used now by all the researchers/scholars/fellows/collectors of the LHH. This classification is the one used in the Hellas catalogues of Karamitsos:

- 1861 - Paris printings
- 1861-1862 - First Athens (Provisional) printings (coarse and fine)
- 1862-1867 - Consecutive Athens (Regular) printings
- 1868-1869 (& 1873 for the 80 lepta) - "Cleaned plates" printings
- 1870 - Special printings (1 lepton and 20 lepta, known as the "shaved")
- 1871-1872 - 1871–1872 printings (known as "inferior quality paper")
- 1872-1876 - Meshed papers printings
- 1876 - New values, Paris printings (30 and 60 lepta)
- 1876-1877 - New values, Athens printings (30 and 60 lepta)
- 1875-1880 - Cream papers printings with "control numbers"
- 1880-1882 - Cream papers printings, without "control numbers"
- 1882 - Change of colours printings (20 & 30 lepta)

The Hellas, Vlastos, Hermes... catalogues are providing tables of equivalence between the numbers of the major catalogues (Yvert & Tellier, Vlastos, Hellas, Michel, Stanley Gibbons, Scott, Hermes...)

For the sake of completeness and for very advanced researches on LHH classification, some additional publications from these following LHH fellows are highly recommended:

- Theodore Groom, The controls of the 20 lepta and their bearing on the classification of Greek stamps of the first type, Philotelia n° 3 & 4 of March 1924 among other articles, in particular in Philotelia, in the Philatelic Journal of Great Britain and in the London Philatelist (RPSL) .
- Ulysse Bellas, La tête de Mercure: Généralités et reconstruction de la planche des 20 lepta, Paris 1978,
- Louis Basel:
1. The Ten Lepta Large Hermes Head Stamp of Greece, Stamford 2001–2005,
2. The Forty Lepta Large Hermes Head Stamp of Greece, Stamford 2004.
- Stephano A. Calliga:
1. The stamps of the large Hermes head - Early Athenian period 1861-1863, Athens, 2011,
2. Stamps of the Large Hermes Head in 19th Century Greece, Athens 2019 & 2020.
- Athanasios D. Spanos, ΕΝΑΣ ΔΙΑΦΟΡΕΤΙΚΟΣ ΤΡΟΠΟΣ ΚΑΤΑΤΑΞΗΣ ΤΩΝ ΕΛΛΗΝΙΚΩΝ ΓΡΑΜΜΑΤΟΣΗΜΩΝ ΤΗΣ ΜΕΓΑΛΗΣ ΚΕΦΑΛΗΣ ΤΟΥ ΕΡΜΗ - ΑΛΓΟΡΙΘΜΟΙ - ΔΙΑΓΡΑΜΜΑΤΑ ΡΟΗΣ, Athens, 2024.

NB: To gain a deeper understanding of Greek philatelic literature, two publications are essential:

- Moses C. Constantinis, The Philatelic Press in Greece (Periodicals, Catalogs and Philatelic Studies), Reprinted from The Philatelic Litterature Review of Passaic, New Jersey - USA - Vol. 9, pp. 3-8 (Summer 1960), Athens 1961.
- Anthony B. Virvilis, Handbook of the Hellenic philately, Athens 2003.

==== Main Colours ====
For each value it's exist a very large spectrum of shades. See:

- Stavros Andreadis, Large Hermes Heads - Printings and Shades, Thessaloniki 2023.
- Athanasios D. Spanos, ΕΝΑΣ ΔΙΑΦΟΡΕΤΙΚΟΣ ΤΡΟΠΟΣ ΚΑΤΑΤΑΞΗΣ ΤΩΝ ΕΛΛΗΝΙΚΩΝ ΓΡΑΜΜΑΤΟΣΗΜΩΝ ΤΗΣ ΜΕΓΑΛΗΣ ΚΕΦΑΛΗΣ ΤΟΥ ΕΡΜΗ - ΑΛΓΟΡΙΘΜΟΙ - ΔΙΑΓΡΑΜΜΑΤΑ ΡΟΗΣ, Athens, 2024.

These are the main colours:

- 1 lepton - brown, without "control numbers"
- 2 lepta - bistre, without "control numbers"
- 5 lepta - green, emerald or light green
- 10 lepta - yellowish orange to red-orange
- 20 lepta - various shades of blue, then aniline-rose & carmine in the 1882 issue
- 30 lepta - olive-brown, then ultramarine in the 1882 issue
- 40 lepta - violet, lilac-brown
- 60 lepta - green to dark green
- 80 lepta - carmine, carmine-rose

=== The Paris printings (October 1861) ===
The first type of the Greek stamps with the Hermes effigy, the head profile turned to the right is issued on October 1st, according to the Julian calendar, still in usage at that time in Greece, or on October 13, 1861, according to the Gregorian calendar adopted by the majority of the European countries in 1582, to the exception of the orthodox ones. Greece finally adopted the Gregorian calendar in 1923. During the period of usage of the LHH (1861-1901), the difference between the 2 calendars was 12 days.

NB: In this study and for the international mails, we are mentioning the two dates: Julian/Gregorian.

The first type of the Greek stamp is named "large Hermes head" in order to differentiate it from the following emission, issued in 1886, and named "small Hermes head" (see below).

The seven values issued in October 1861 have been printed in Paris by the printer Ernest Meyer, on sheets of 150 stamps (10 X 15).
These seven values are the 1 lepton, 2, 5, 10, 20, 40 & 80 lepta:

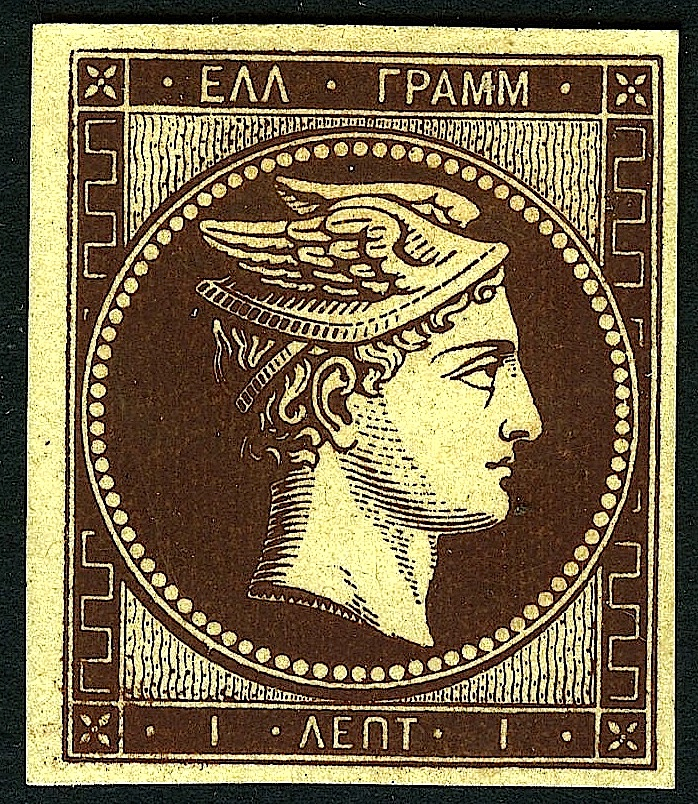
1 lepton

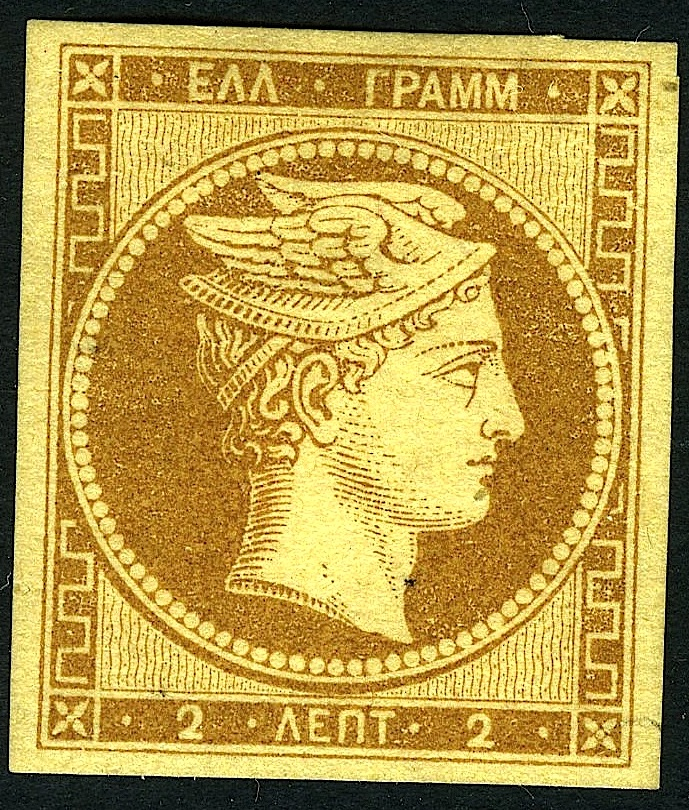
2 lepta

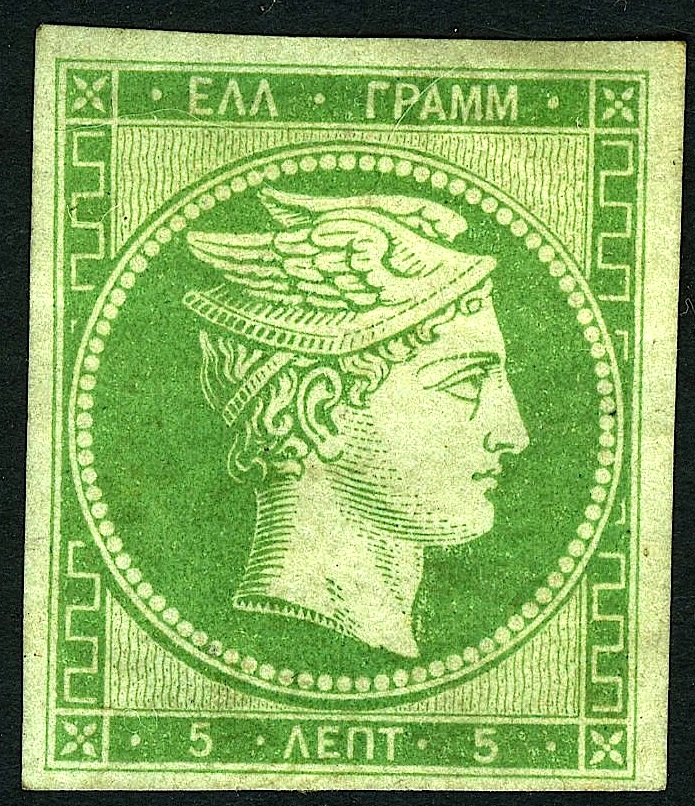
5 lepta

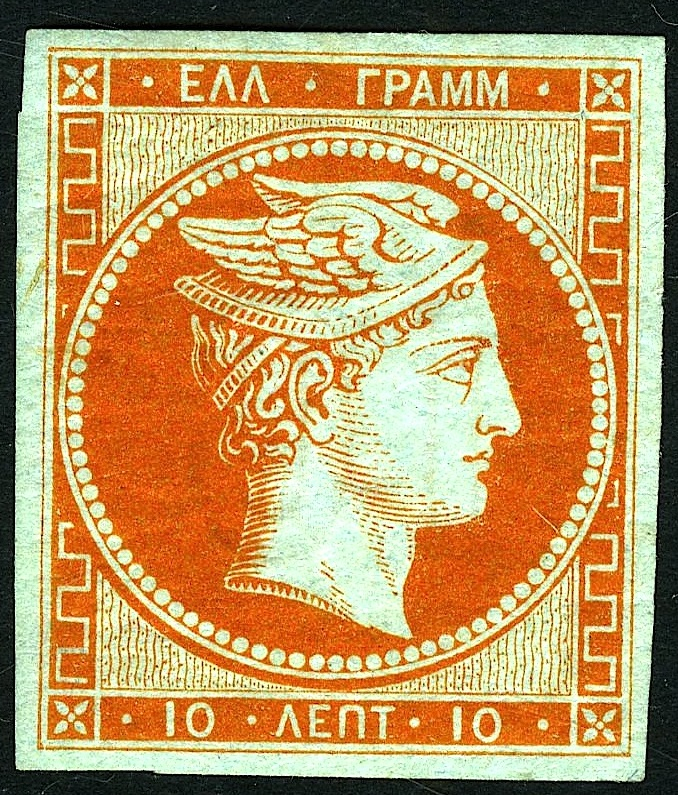
10 lepta

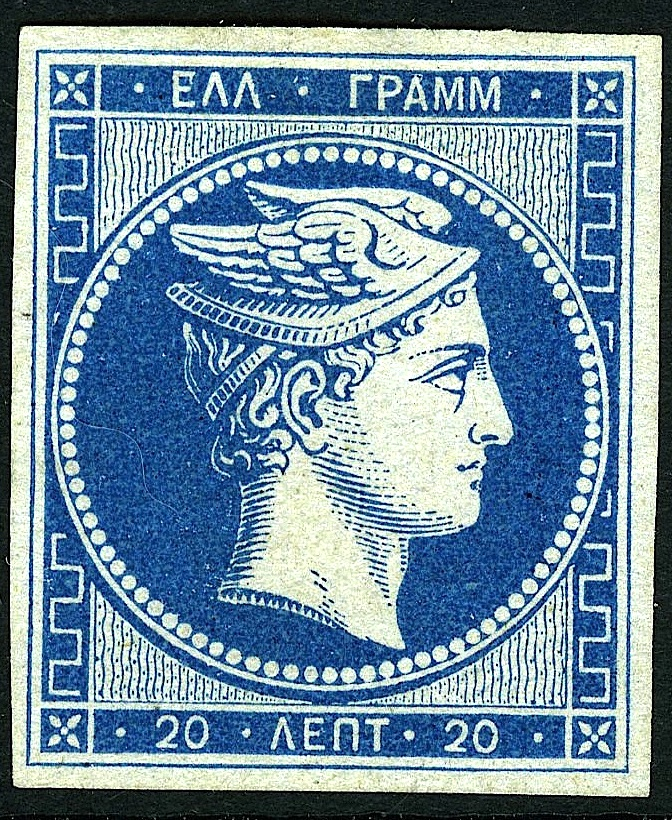
20 lepta

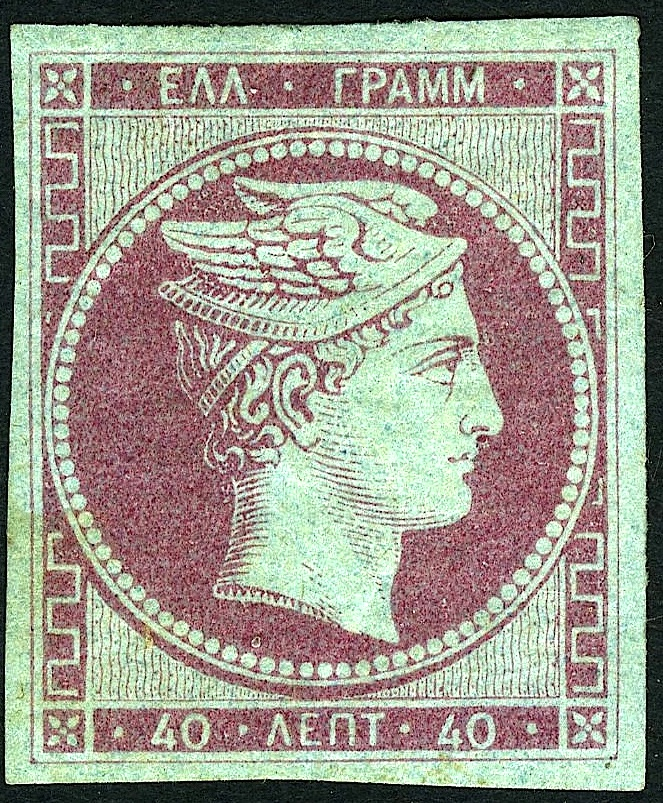
40 lepta

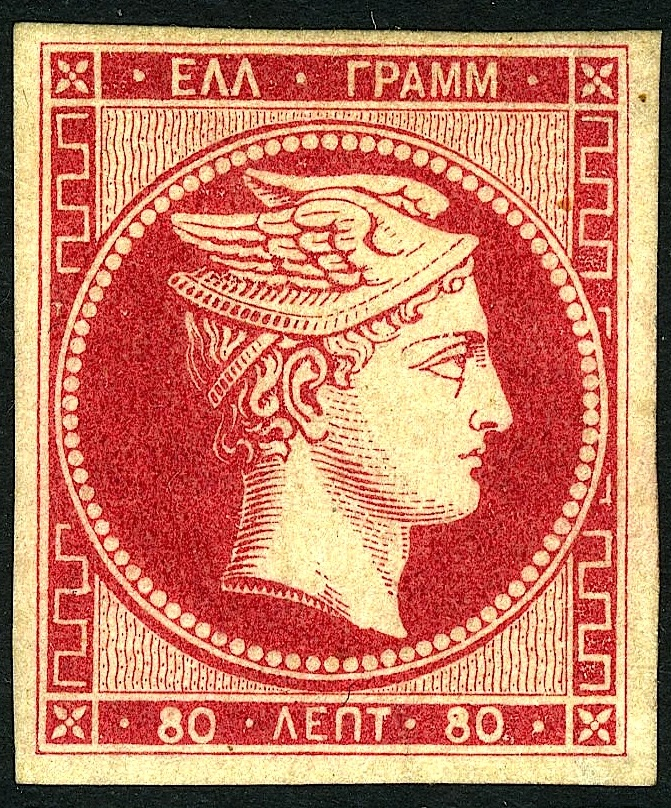
80 lepta

Only the 10 lepta carry "control numbers" on its back.
These numbers are 8 mm high, when all the following ones, printed in Athens on any value, will be 6.5 mm high.

The Paris issues are easily recognisable by the fine detail when they are printed on satin papers and are lightly tinted. The shading lines of the cheek and the nape are thin and discontinued. In particular, the wavy lines and the points in the spandrels are clearly visible.

Quantities printed in Paris in 1861:

Value	Color	Quantity
1 lepton	Brown	300,000
2 lepta	Bistre	224,000
5 lepta	Green	130,000
10 lepta	Orange on blue	100,000
20 lepta	Blue	321,000
40 lepta	Mauve on blue	130,000
80 lepta	Rose-carmine	140,000
Total	-	1,345,000

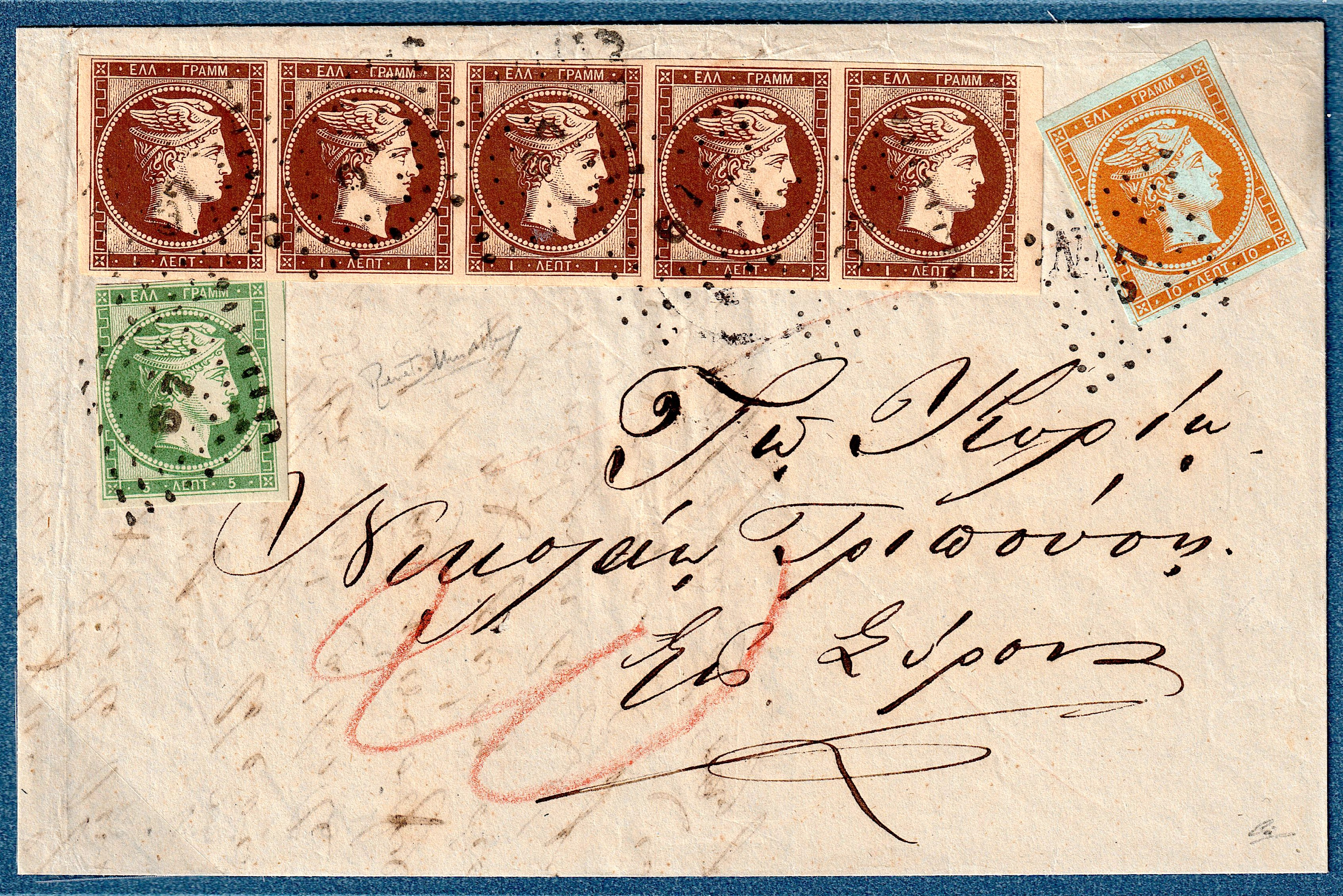

Unpaid letter sent from Chios on November 25th, 1861 (date of the correspondence), arrived and taxed at Syros (67) on December 6th, 1861 with the diamond cancellation (type I) on the stamps and the dated circular postmark (type II) on the back of the cover, via Smyrna, Turkey with the Lloyd Adriatico agency postmark below the strip of five of the 1 lepton. Taxed at the domestic rate of 20 lepta for a letter up to 15 grams, with a strip of five 1 lepton, one 5 lepta and one 10 lepta. All the stamps are from the Paris printing.

NB: Postage-due stamps were introduced in Greece only in 1875, so the “large Hermes heads” were also used for the taxation of the letters from 1861 to 1875.

=== The Athens printings (November 1861 to 1882) ===
Then, and as soon as in late October/early November 1861, the printings have been done in Athens from the same seven typographic plates sent, by Désiré-Albert Barre to the Greek postal administration during the summer 1861.

Printing after printing, the technical improvement of the Greek printers, as well as the fouling of the typographic plates can be seen.

The printing of the control numbers at the back of the stamps is becoming a constant, except for the two smallest values, the 1 lepton, brown, and the 2 lepta, bistre. All further printings took place in Athens and the stamps remained in use until the introduction of the Small Hermes heads in 1886.

The printings were done "on demand", and the colour shades evolved within a very broad spectrum.

As well, several different quality of papers have been used during the Athens period of printing (from 1861 to 1882). Hence, it exists a very large diversity of "large Hermes head" stamp printings. The most advanced studies on the subject: Glasewald, Pemberton, Groom, Dorning Beckton, Brunel, Nicolaïdès, de Smeth, Kohl Handbuck, Constantinidès, Bellas, Coundouros, Basel, Calligas, Papitsis, Spanos..., are describing them in details (see the paragraph "Classification" above and the bibliography at the end).

The classification of Yvert et Tellier, has been resumed, enhanced and completed first by Orestis Vlastos in the Vlastos catalogues and then by Michael Tseriotis in the Hellas/Karamitsos catalogues. We will use this last one to go through the main emissions:

==== The first Athens printings (November 1861 to April 1862) ====
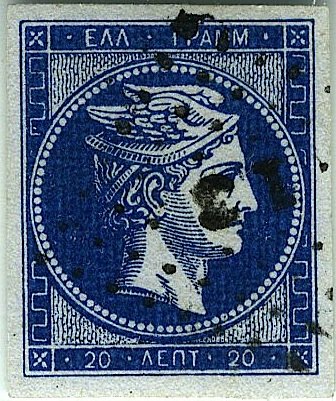
20 lepta of the first Athens printing with "quadrillé" background and without "control numbers"

The stocks of stamps received from Paris became empty very quickly, in particular in the main post offices (Athens, Piraeus, Syros...), though starting the end of October/early November 1861, the Greek postal administration was obliged to start to use the typographic plates received from Paris, in order to print its own first sheets of stamps.

The Greek workers were far to have the level of experience of the French ones who were used to printing methods since several generations... Thus, the result was disappointing, the background of the medallion was not uniform anymore, the Hermes head was very often circled by a whitish halo and the four spandrels were also often "unclear". The shadow lines of the cheek and the nape are now continued and thicker than on the Paris printings.

Nevertheless, these stamps, printed with various methods ("hard printing", au blanchet, with mixed technics...), for those printed with the "hard printing" method, without any "foulage", have a strong character, due to the density of the used inks, and to their contrast. So, they are as popular and studied, as the Paris printings.

Some examples are finely printed and are considered nearly comparable in quality to the Paris printings, while others are noticeably coarser. For this reason, catalogues generally classify them into two categories: fine printings and coarse printings.

As for all the Athens printings, these various issues identification is only possible, for sure, by using the "control numbers" at the back of the stamps that are mandatory for a correct classification.

For the first Athens printings, the "control numbers" were used for the first time, so they were clear and well printed.

As well, the "control number" "5" of the 5 lepta value was different from the one which was used for all the following Athens printings up to 1880.

The famous 20 lepta without "control figures", with the "quadrillé" or solid background (Yvert/Vlastos n° 9 & Hellas n° 8), are belonging to these printings.

The issue is usually called "Athens "provisoire" ("temporary") issue". Indeed, one can believe that these stamps, due to the poor quality of their printing for some of them, were plate-proofs done by the Greek printers to initiate themselves to these new technics... But the stamps demand was so strong that the Greek postal administration decided to use them for regular postal service anyway... for the joy of the future philatelists.

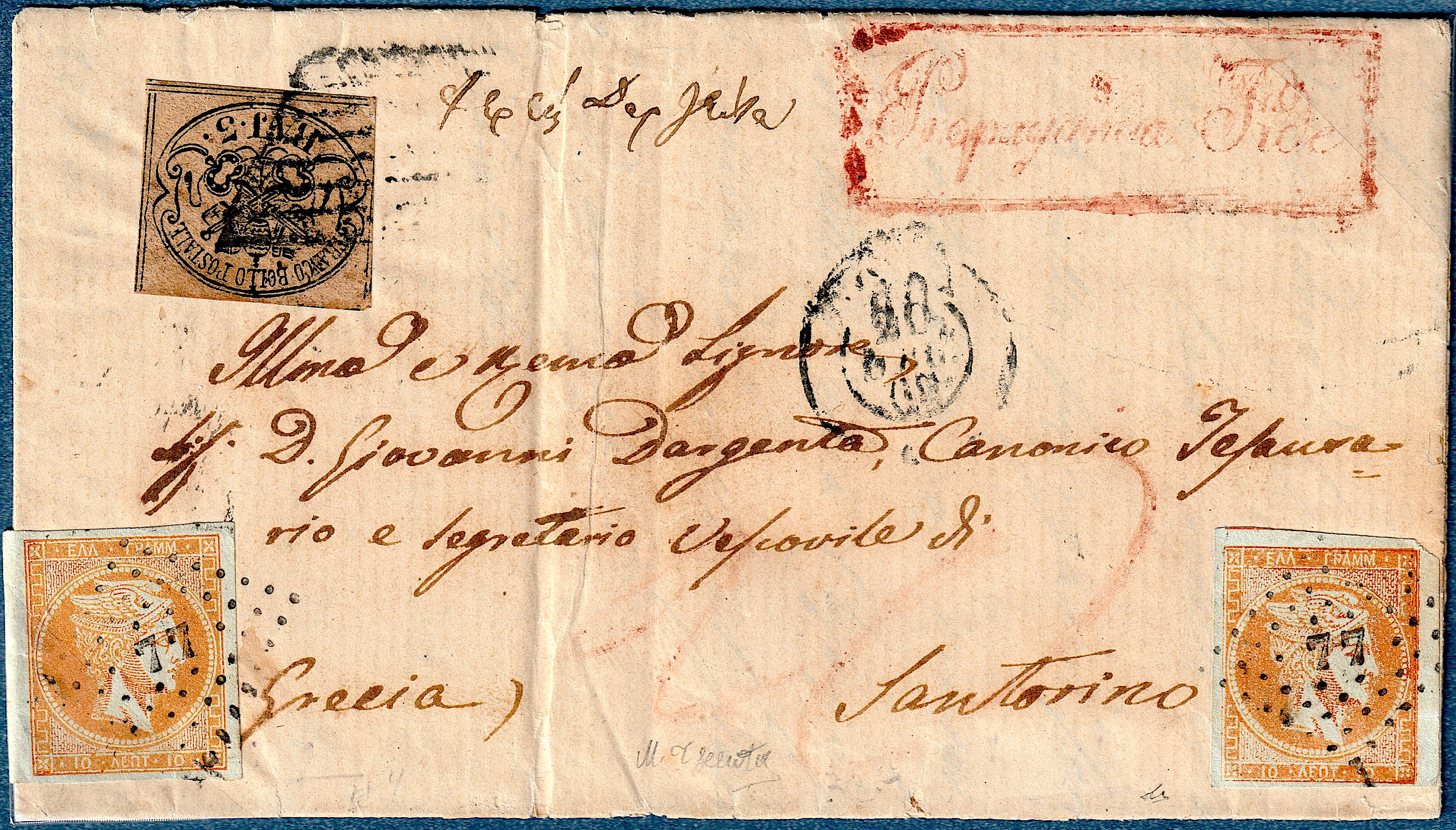

Partially prepaid letter sent from Rome, Papal states on November 28th/December 10th, 1862 (date of the correspondence), arrived and taxed at Thera (77) on December 24th, 1862/January 5th, 1863, via Syros (67) on December 15th/27th, 1862. Franked at three bajocchi, reduced rate for a letter less than 7 & ½ grams granted to the sender: the “Congregation for the Evangelization of Peoples” or “Congregation for the Propagation of the Faith” (red rectangular postmark “Propaganda Fide” on the top-right of the cover) instead the regular rate of twenty-one bajocchi. The letter has been taxed at the arrival at 20 lepta, the Greek internal rate for a letter up to 15 grams.

This letter followed this itinerary:

- Departure from Rome on November 28th/December 10th, 1862 (date of the correspondence),
- Land routed from Rome to Civitavecchia, port on the Tyrrhenian sea, at the south-west of Roma, between November 28th/December 10th, 1862 and December 9th/21st, 1862,
- Transported by the “Céphise” of the “ligne d’Italie” of the French boat company Paquebots de la Méditerranée between Civitavecchia on December 9th/21st, 1862 & Messina on December 11th/23rd, 1862,
- Transferred on the “Neva” of the “ligne du Levant” of the French boat company Paquebots de la Méditerranée between Messina on December 11th/23rd, 1862 and Piraeus on December 14th/26th, 1862,
- Transferred on a French boat of the “lignes de l’archipel” of the French boat company Paquebots de la Méditerranée between Piraeus on December 15th/27th, 1862 and Syros on December 15th/27th, 1862,
- Transferred on a Greek boat between Syros and Thera between December 15th/27th, 1862 and December 24th, 1862/January 5th, 1863,
- Arrived in Thera on December 24th, 1862/January 5th, 1863.

The two 10 lepta are from one of the first Athens printings (1861/1862).
Only two letters with the “Propaganda Fide” preferred rate are known up to now.

The printing of the first Athens printings is ending in April 1862.

==== The regular or consecutive Athens printings (May 1862 to 1867) ====
Starting May 1862, the Greek printers stopped totally the usage of the hard printing method ("tirage à sec"), and used another one, (named the soft printing method or "au blanchet") much more easier to put in place.

In order to increase the contrast between the dark and the light parts of the printing, a blanket was inserted below the sheet to be printed and the typographic plate. This method allowed to get much better overall results without however reaching the quality of the first Athens fine printings or obviously, those of the Paris printings... This method was giving a strong "foulage" to the stamps, in particular at the shadow lines of the neck, with, very often, a relief ("foulage") visible on the back of the stamp. At the beginning of these printings (1862–1863), the shadow lines of the cheek are continued and straight before becoming ticker after...

The "control numbers" are fine but much lighter than on the first Athens printings.

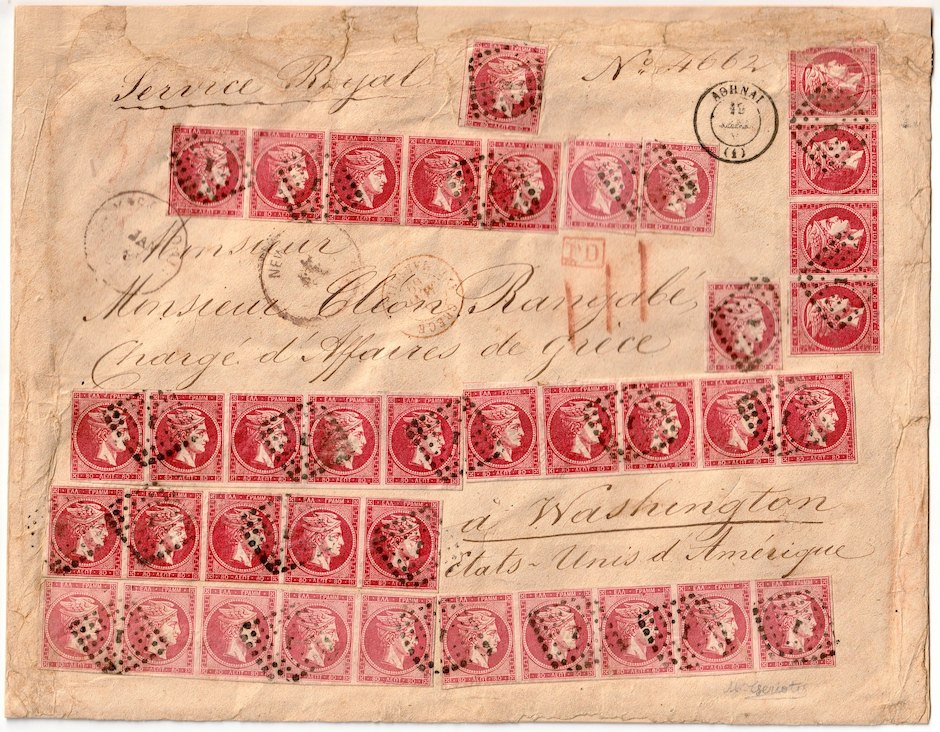

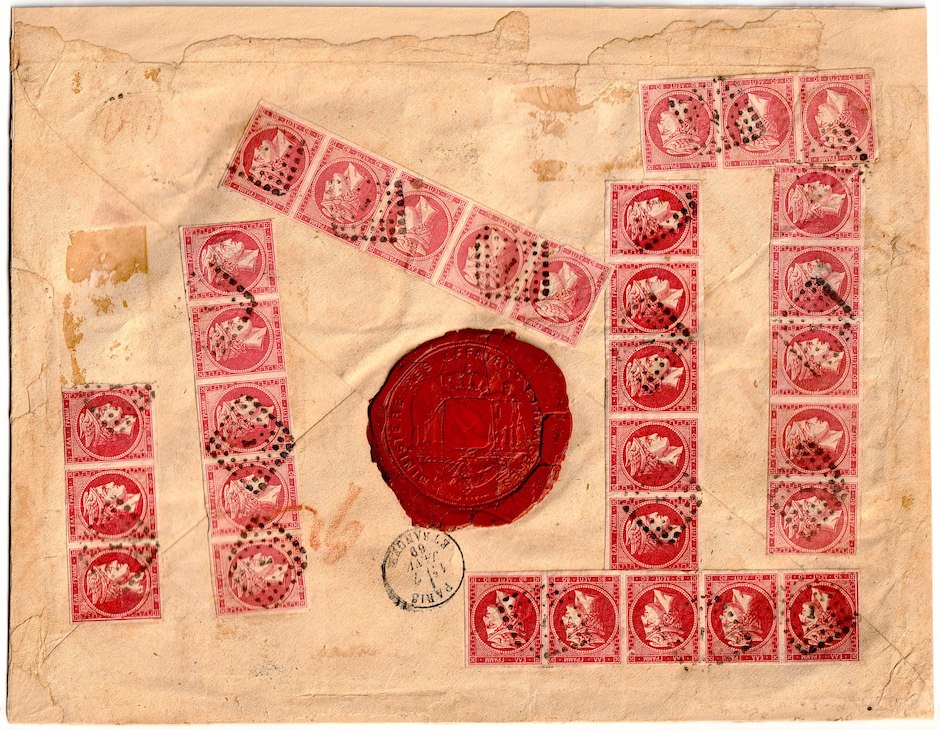

The Ranghavis letter
The highest known franking, as of today, with Large Hermes Heads of Greece
(with 69 stamps of the 80 lepta of the consecutive Athens printings)

==== The so-called "cleaned plates" printings (1868 to 1869) ====
In 1868, the printings are becoming pale and dull, and without contrast, but the impression is fine.

For a long period of time, one believed that it was due to the cleaning of the typographic plates as the named of these printings is referring to. In fact, it is not the case at all, as the typographic plates have been cleaned only in 1870. This pale/dull aspect is coming from the usage of a new blanket ("blanchet") much thicker as demonstrated by Louis Basel.

The "control numbers" are becoming thicker and are not as fine as on the previous printings...

The "control numbers" errors are very frequent in particular, the "1" inverted for the 10 lepta or the "2" inverted for the 20 lepta as well as the "0" inverted for the two values.

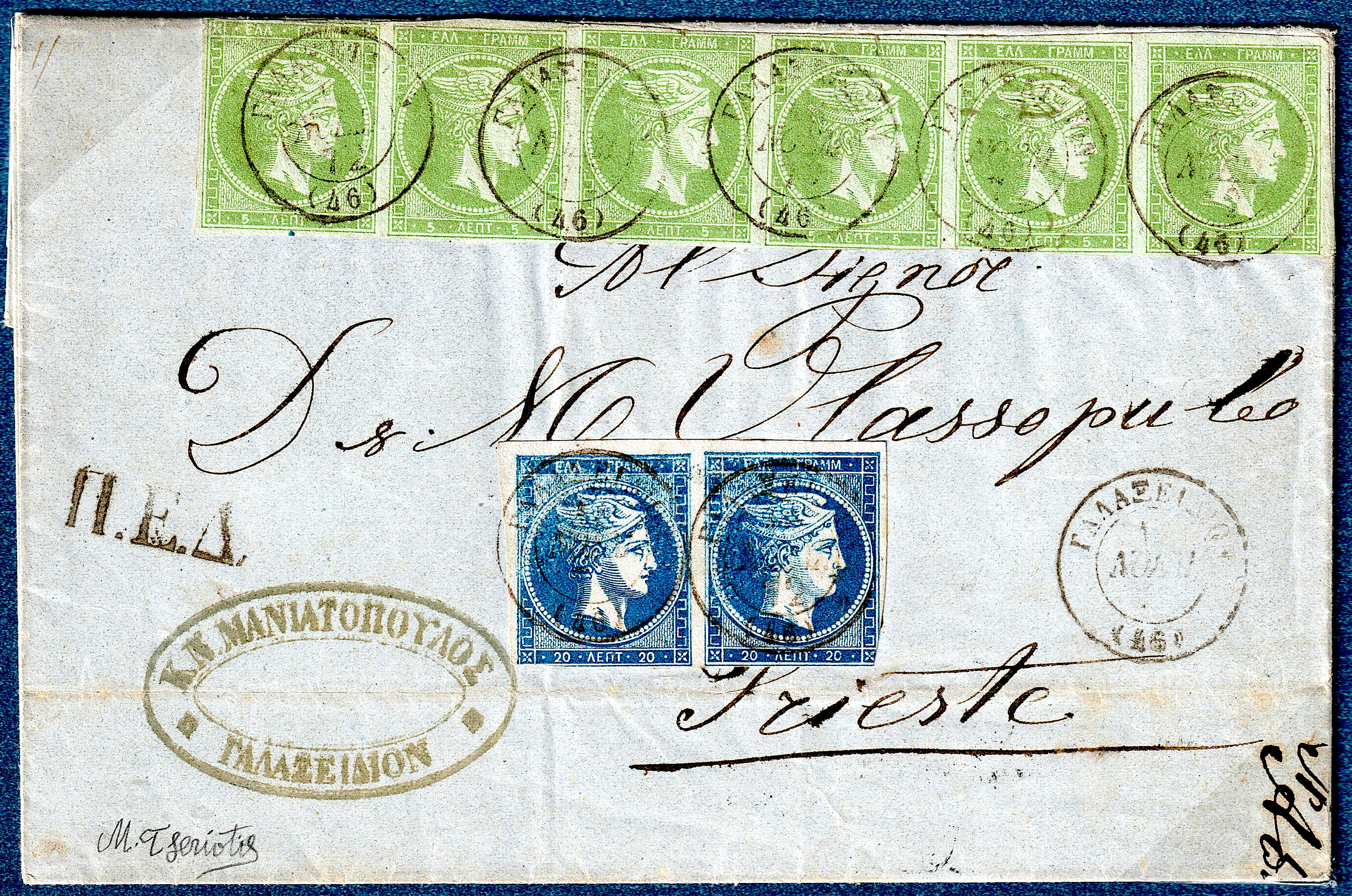

Prepaid letter sent from Galaxidi (46) on November 18th/30th, 1872, arrived at Trieste, Austria-Hungary on November 23rd/December 5th, 1872, via Corfu (106) on November 21st/December 3rd, 1872. Franked at 70 lepta, the rate for a pre-paid letter up to 15 grams from Greece to Austria according to the 1867 convention and the circular n° 9 of April 10th, 1868 between the two countries. The sender overpaid 15 lepta, ignoring that the rate, according from this same 1867 convention, was fixed at 55 lepta for the Austrian harbours like Trieste.

Black postmark “ΠΕΔ” or “ΠΛΙΡΩΜΕΝΟΝ ΕΞΟΤΕΡΙΚΟΝ ΔΗΚΕΩΜΑ” for “Paid to Foreign Destination".

The strip of six of the 5 lepta is from the “cleaned plates” printings (1868/1869), the largest multiple of this value kwon to date and the pair of the 20 lepta is from the 1871/1872 printings.

==== The special printing or the new "mise en train" (1870) ====
In 1870, the Greek postal administration has received a new printing press from Germany.

The German worker(s) who came in Athens to install this new machine have also done a new "mise en train" and have printed, using the hard method ("à sec"), sheets of the two most used values: (1 lepton for the newspapers and 20 lepta for the domestic letters, up to 15 grams).

The result was once more, very disappointing: the impression was fine but, the shadow lines of the cheek are very short. On the 20 lepta, the spandrels are whiten and the head is quite often circled by a whitish halo. The stamps of this emission are called by the collectors "the shaved":

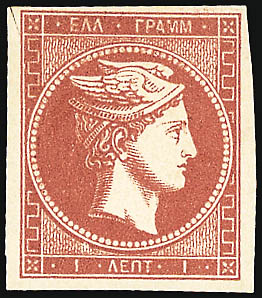

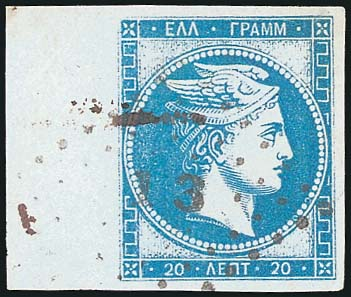
The "shaved" 1 lepton & 20 Lepta of the 1870 Special printings

The "control numbers" of the 20 lepta are milky-blue or deep-blue and always clear by are becoming even thicker.

==== The printings on the so-called "inferior quality papers" (1871 & 1872) ====
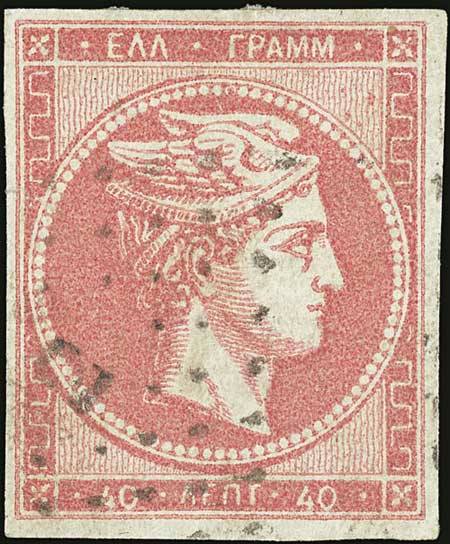
40 lepta "Solférino" of the so-called "inferior quality papers" printings

From the beginning of the 1870s years, the supply of the papers from France has been stopped due to the Franco-Prussian war. The Greek mint started to use papers from unknown provenance of relative good quality but with half-transparent and regular "clouds" visible by transparency on the light.

The usage of the "blanchet" was substituted to the hard printing method of the previous issue and will continue to be used for all the following issues up to the end of the printings, in 1882.

The shadow lines of the cheek and the nape of the neck of the Hermes head are long and uniform but thicker than on the previous issues.

The "control numbers" of this issue are clear, well printed and darker than the previous issues, but they are also heavier due to the usage of the same printing plate since ten years.

The most famous stamp of the "large Hermes head" collection is a variety of this issue: this is the 40 lepta of the same shade as the "control numbers" of the typical stamp of this same value. A single sheet has been printed and used from Pireas post office. Only 13 items have survived, as far as we know today (Yvert n° 22Ba, Hellas n° 36a). These include 11 single stamps, one stamp on a fragment with an arrival postmark "Constantinople - Turkey" and one on an entire letter to Larnaca, Cyprus. All are cancelled with either a Type I dotted stamp "2" or a type II postmark "Piraeus", on 12, 13 and 14 July 1871. Due to their bloody-red colour, they were nicknamed "Solferino" in reference to the famous bloody Battle of Solferino of 1859, between the French-Sardinian coalition and the Austrian army in Northern Italy.

==== The printings on meshed papers (1871 to 1876) ====
Starting the end of 1871, the papers used are of less and less good quality. They are very thin, almost transparent and "fragile" (the front drawing is visible from the back) and in the light by transparency, they are showing a mesh/tram of regular holes.

The "control numbers" are again even thicker... Here again, many errors are found.

As these papers were absorbing the ink more than the previous ones, many shades variations are existing, and some of them are quite surprising and are more numerous than on the previous issues.

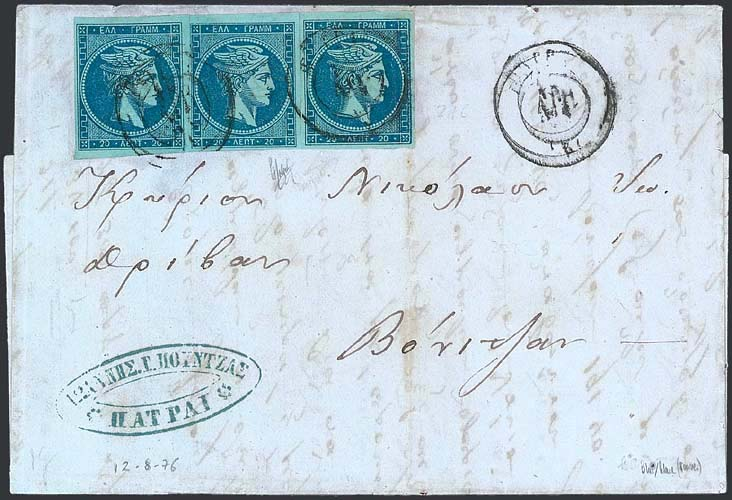

Letter from Patras (9) on August 12th, 1876 to Vonitsa (57).
The franking of 60 Lepta is corresponding to the 3rd level of weight of the domestic rate for a letter from 30 to 45 grams.
The three 20 lepta, blue indigo are from the meshed papers printings (1871/1876)

==== The printings of the two new values: 30 & 60 lepta - Paris emission (1876) ====
In 1875, following Greece entrance to the Union Générale des Postes (U.G.P.), ancestor of the Universal Postal Union (U.P.U.), as a founder member, the Greek postal administration launched two new values (30 & 60 Lepta) for the international mail.

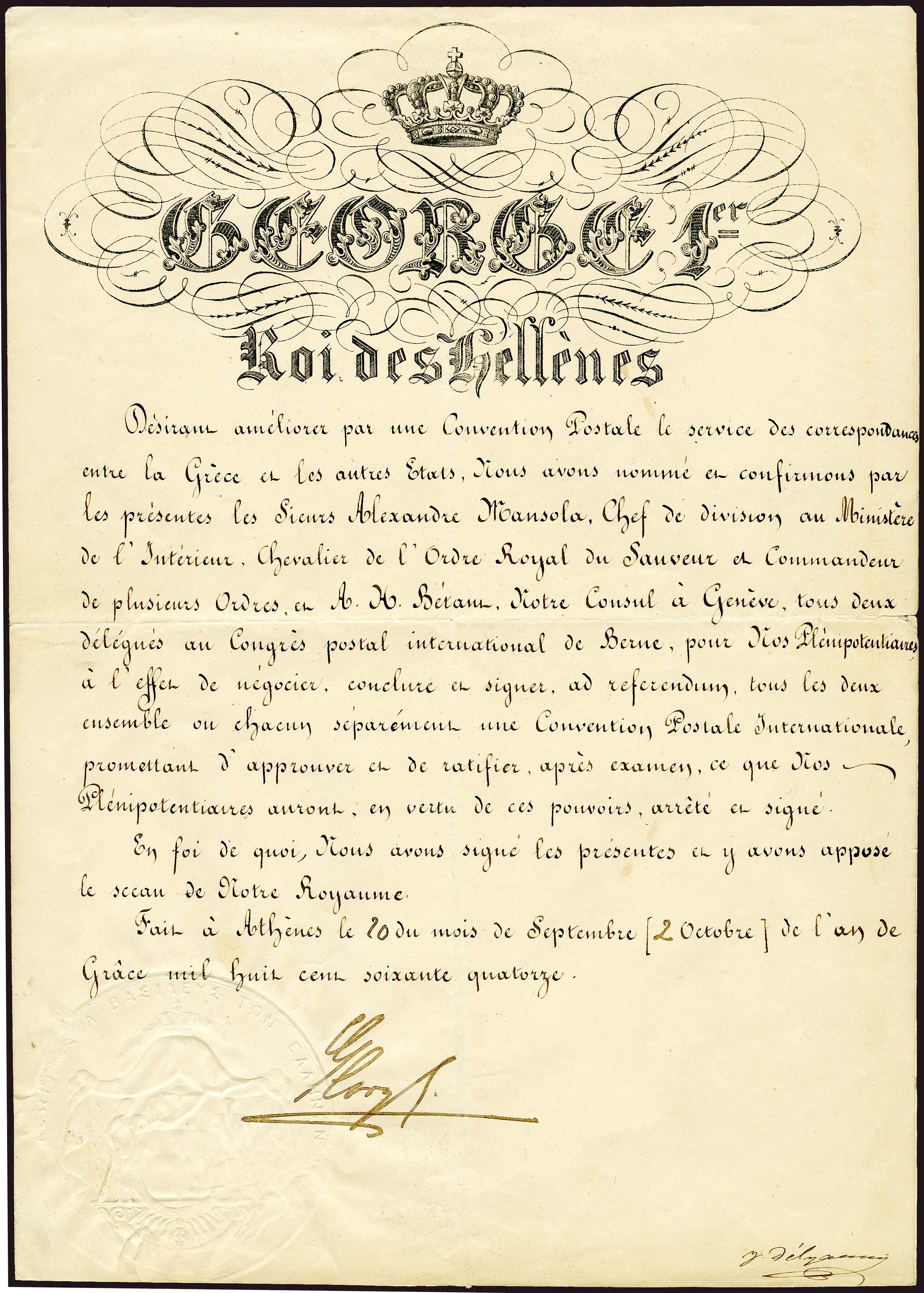

Royal Decree for sending two représentatives of the Kingdom of Greece
to the first U.G.P. congress in Berne, Switzerland on October 1874

From the same die used in 1861 to build the typographic plates of the first seven values, Désiré-Albert Barre has created the plates for the 30 lepta (brown) and the 60 lepta (green) necessary for the international mail.

Unlike the seven first typographic plates realised in 1861 with the "direct striking in the coining press" method, these two new plates have been manufactured, under the supervision of Désiré-Albert Barre, with the "Galvanoplasty-type" method, by the company: Charles-Dierrey, 6 & 12, rue Notre-Dame-des-Champs in Paris. The typographic plates had 300 clichés, consisting of two galvanos of 150 clichés each.

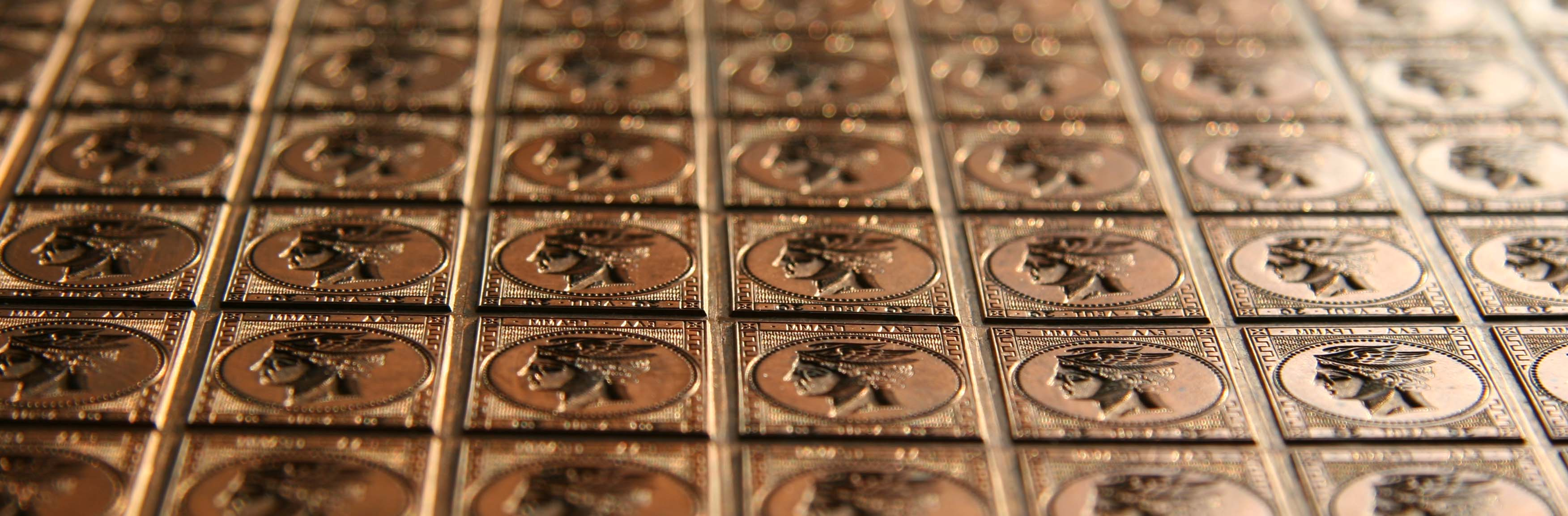

Detail of a typographic plate (galvano) of the 30 lepta of 1876

These two values have been printed by the printer J. Claye & Cie, 7, rue Saint Benoît, in Paris.

Quantities printed in Paris (1876):

Value	Color	Quantity
30 lepta	Brown	150,000
60 lepta	Green	150,000
Total	-	300,000

As the Paris printings of 1861, this printing is very fine. These two new values do not wear any "control number" on their back.

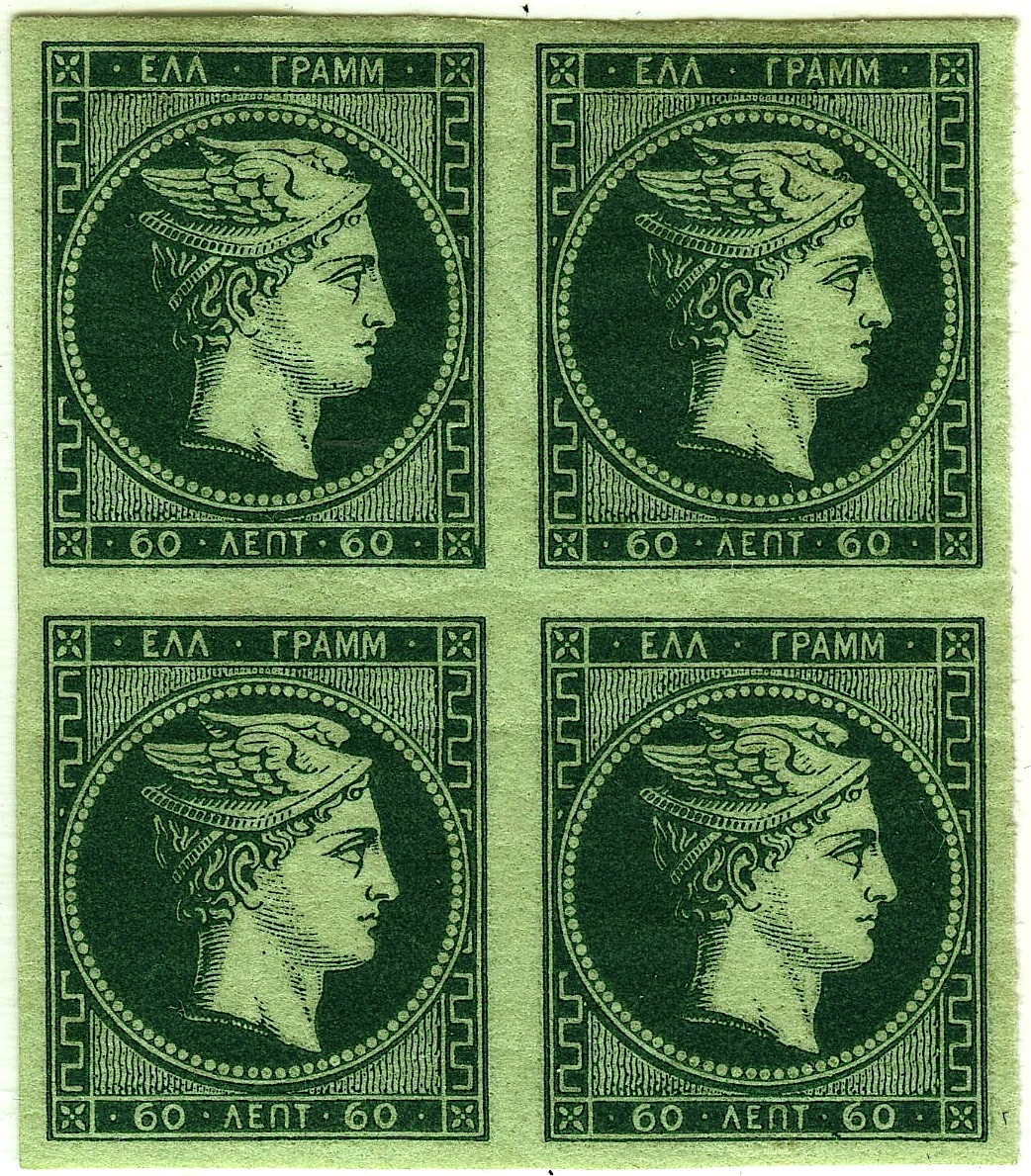
60 lepta of the Paris printing (1876)

==== The printings of the two new values: 30 & 60 lepta - Athens emissions (1876 & 1877) ====
Like in 1861, after a first printing of the two values, done in Paris, all the following ones have been done in Athens with the same typographic plates sent from Paris.

The 30 lepta has a large spectrum on shades from olive-brown to red-brown and it's found on thin or yellowish papers.

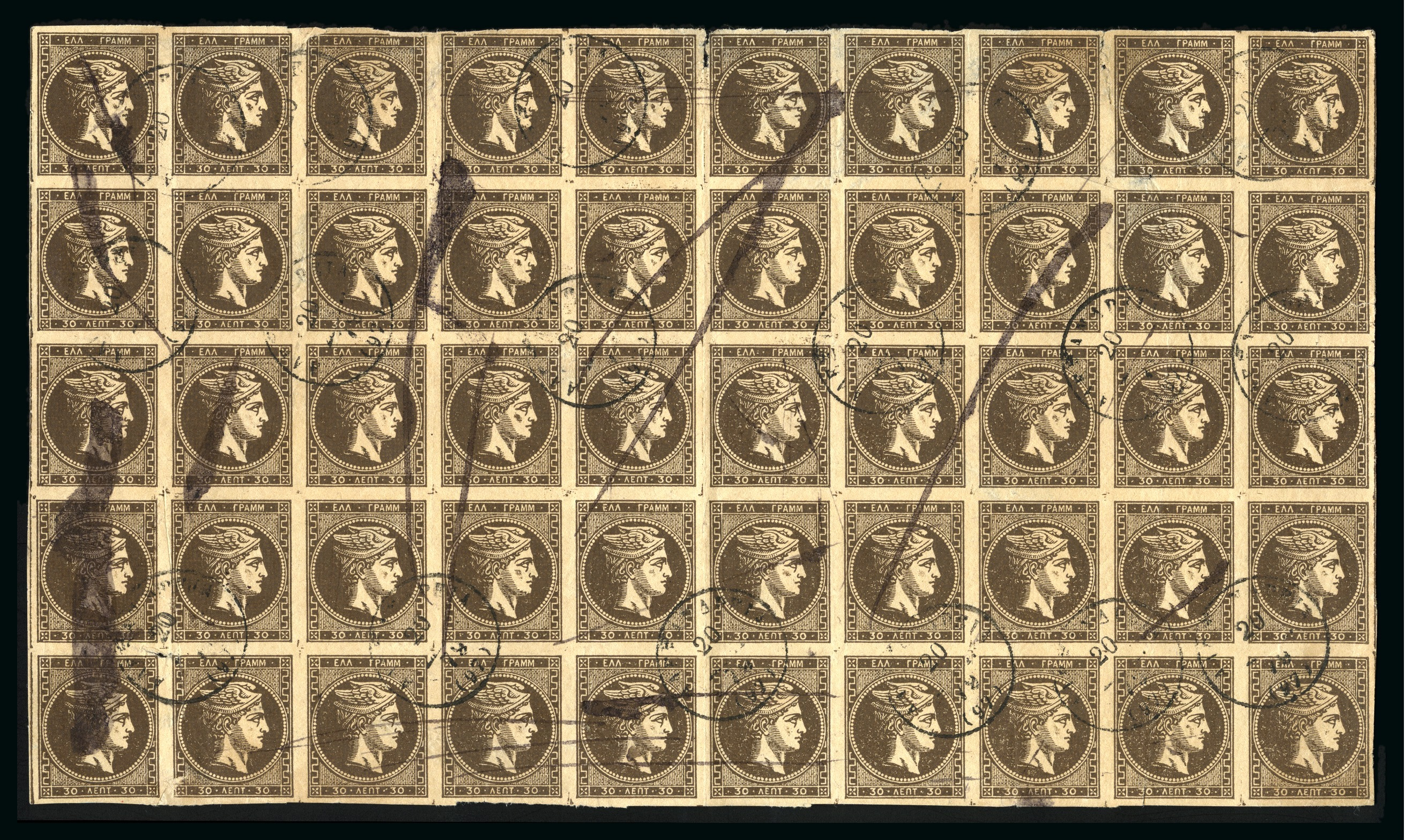

Block of fifty of the 30 lepta, grey-brown,
cancelled with the type II postmark of Alexandria (97) and with pen stokes.
Athens printings (1876/1877).
The largest cancelled multiple of this value known today.

The 60 lepta is deep-green to dark deep-green.

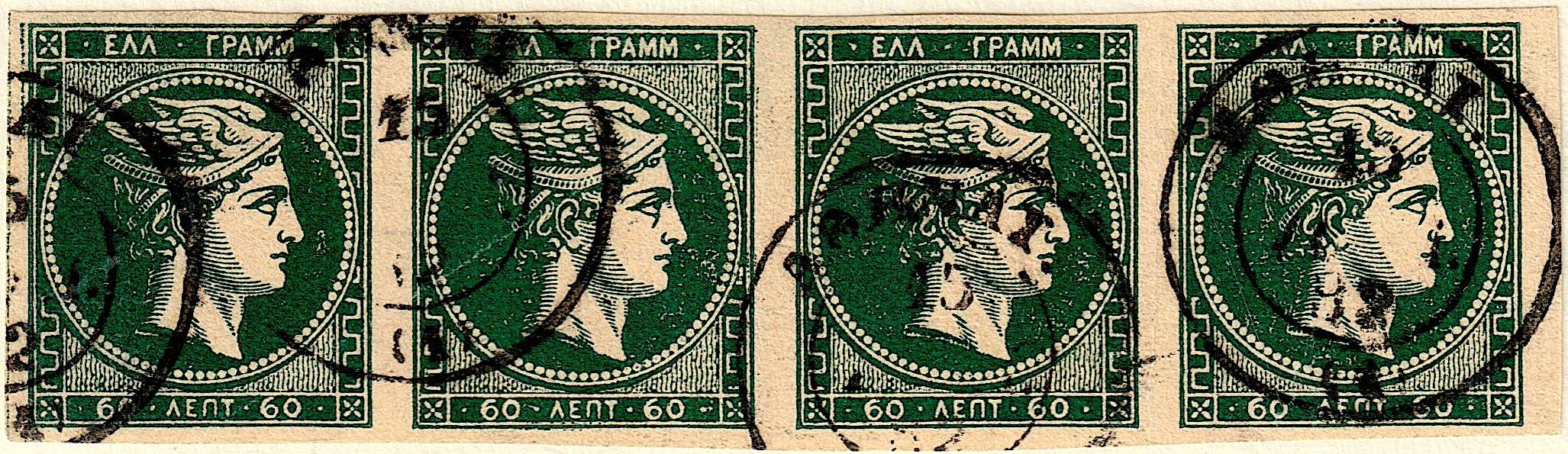

Strip of four of the 60 lepta of the Athens printings, deep green.
Cancelled with the type II postmark of Athens (1).

==== The cream papers printings with "control numbers" (1875 to 1880) ====
The last printings done from 1875 to 1882, are remarkable by their paper of cream colour, very easily recognisable by looking at the back of the stamp.

The typographic plates have not been cleaned for several years, the printing is more and more heavy.

After fifteen years of usage, the "control numbers" plates is giving very thick figures without any distinction between the downstrokes and the upstrokes. See the conference on how to recognize the various emissions of the Large Hermes Heads (in French): La « grosse tête d’Hermès » de Grèce

A very large number of "control numbers" errors is existing in this issue.

Due to the fouling of the typographic plates, stamps, printed at the late 1870s/beginning 1880s, can be found with very coarse printing.
Comparison of two 1 Lepton printed from the same typographic plate:

- The first one is from the Paris printings (1861),
- The second one is from one of the printings on cream papers of the late 1870s
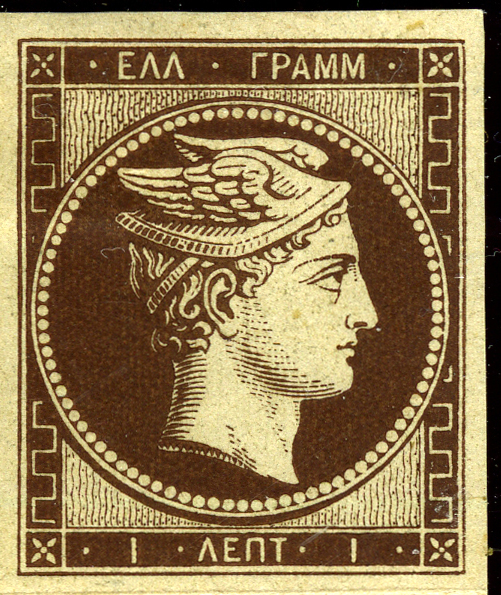
1 lepton of the Paris printings (1861)

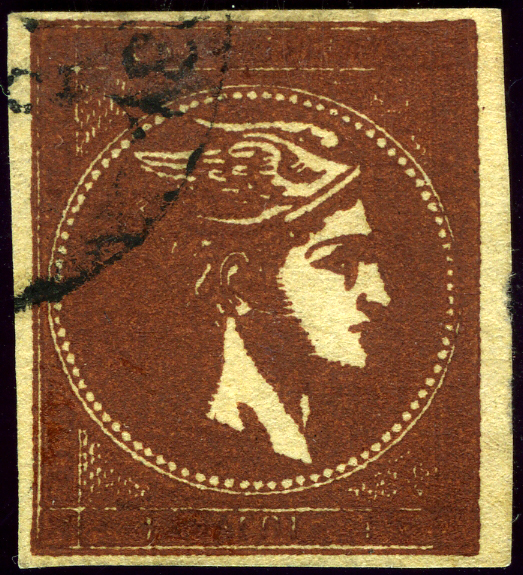
1 lepton of the Cream papers Athens printings (late 70s)

The "control numbers" are disappearing in 1880 for the two coming last issues.

==== The cream papers printings without "control numbers" (1880 to 1882) ====
Around the end of the 1870s or at the beginning of the 1880s, the plates are finally cleaned (for the second time after the first cleaning of 1870) and the stamps are printed with an outstanding finesse. The papers are the same as the previous issue (cream to yellowish) but without any "control number" at the back of the stamp.

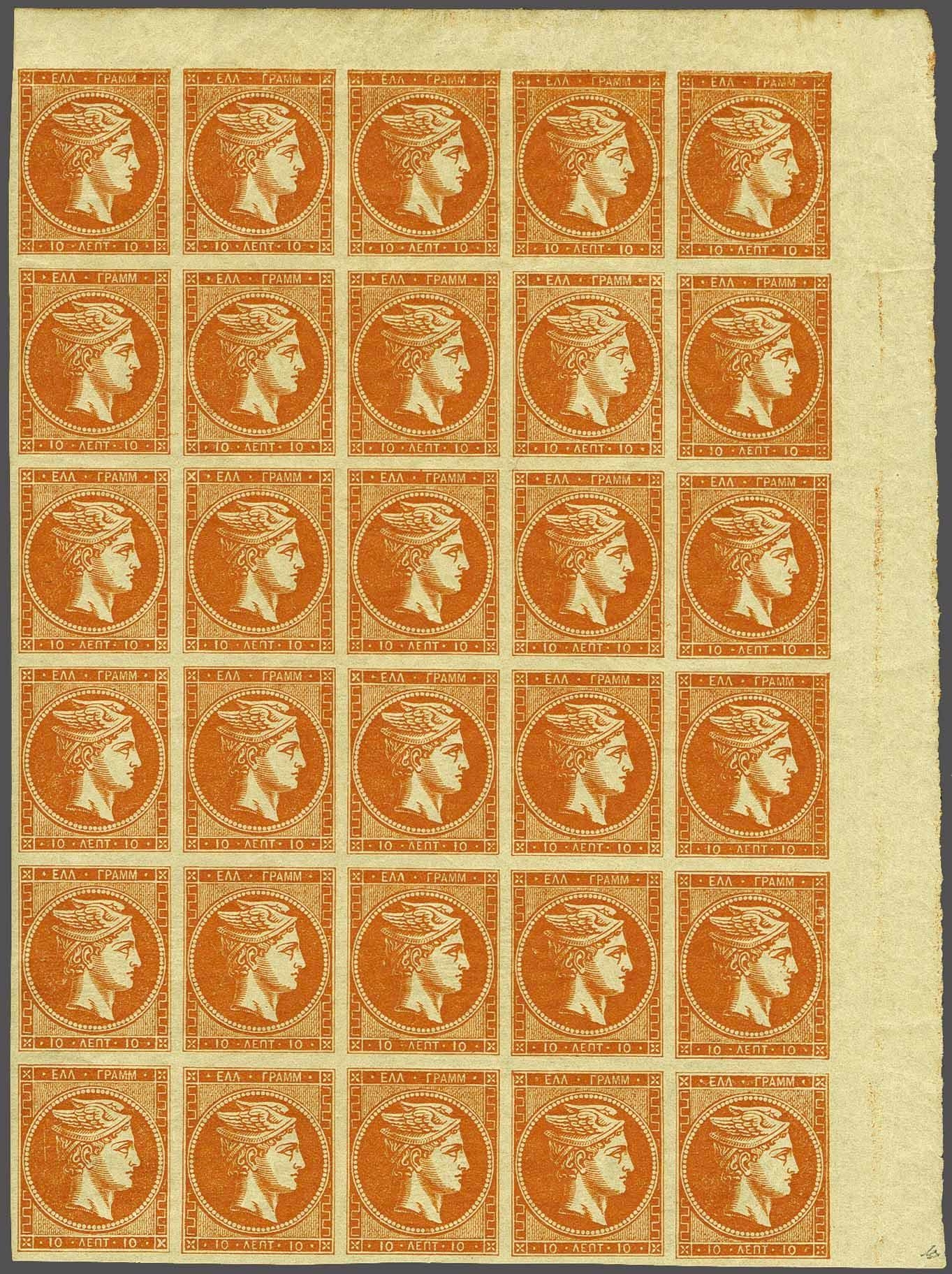

Corner block of thirty of the 10 lepta, orange.
Cream papers printing w/o “control numbers” (1880/1882)

==== The change of colours (1882) ====
In 1882, the change de colours of the stamps for the domestic rate (20 lepta) and the international rate (30 lepta) is becoming mandatory in order to comply to the U.P.U. (Union Postale Universelle) new rules.

The 20 lepta are pink (aniline) and red (carmine), the 30 lepta is blue to grey-blue.

These stamps do not have "control number" on their back.

The nine values of the "large Hermes head" have been printed from the same nine typographic plates (one per value) during more than twenty years (from 1861 to 1882) for the first seven values.

If the final printing is dated in 1882, the stamps of the "large Hermes head" stayed in circulation up to 1886 and were then replaced by the new type of stamp: the "small Hermes head".

==== The overprinted "large Hermes head" (1900 to 1901) ====
In September 1900, due to the shipment delay of the new issue of the "flying Hermes" by the English printer J.P. Segg & Co, the Greek postal administration decided to reuse the old stocks on the anterior issues, including those of the "large Hermes head" (these overprints also exist on the "Olympic 1896" and on the "small Hermes head" issues).

They are overprinted "AM", in black, for "Αξια Μεταλλικη" ("Metal Value") and with values in drachms. The usage of these stamps was reserved to the postal parcels and to postal orders ("mandats") and were paid in "gold drachm".

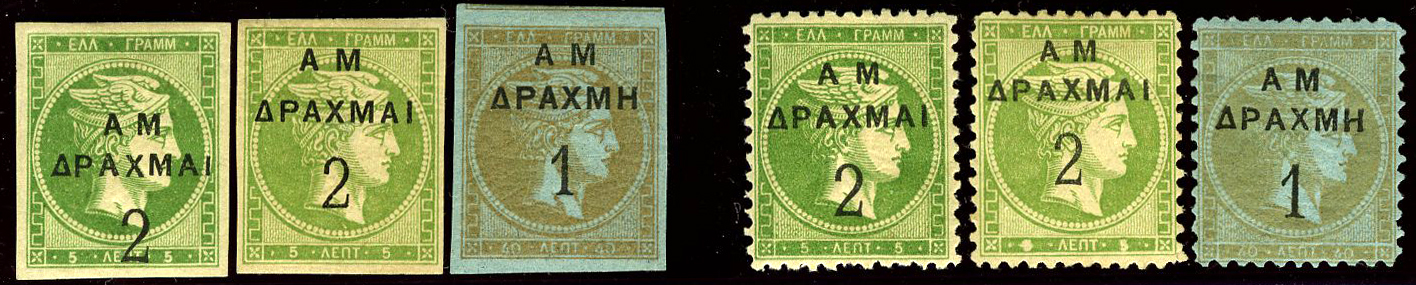
Série surchargée, valeurs métalliques, non dentelée et dentelée

They are really very rare on non-philatelic documents.

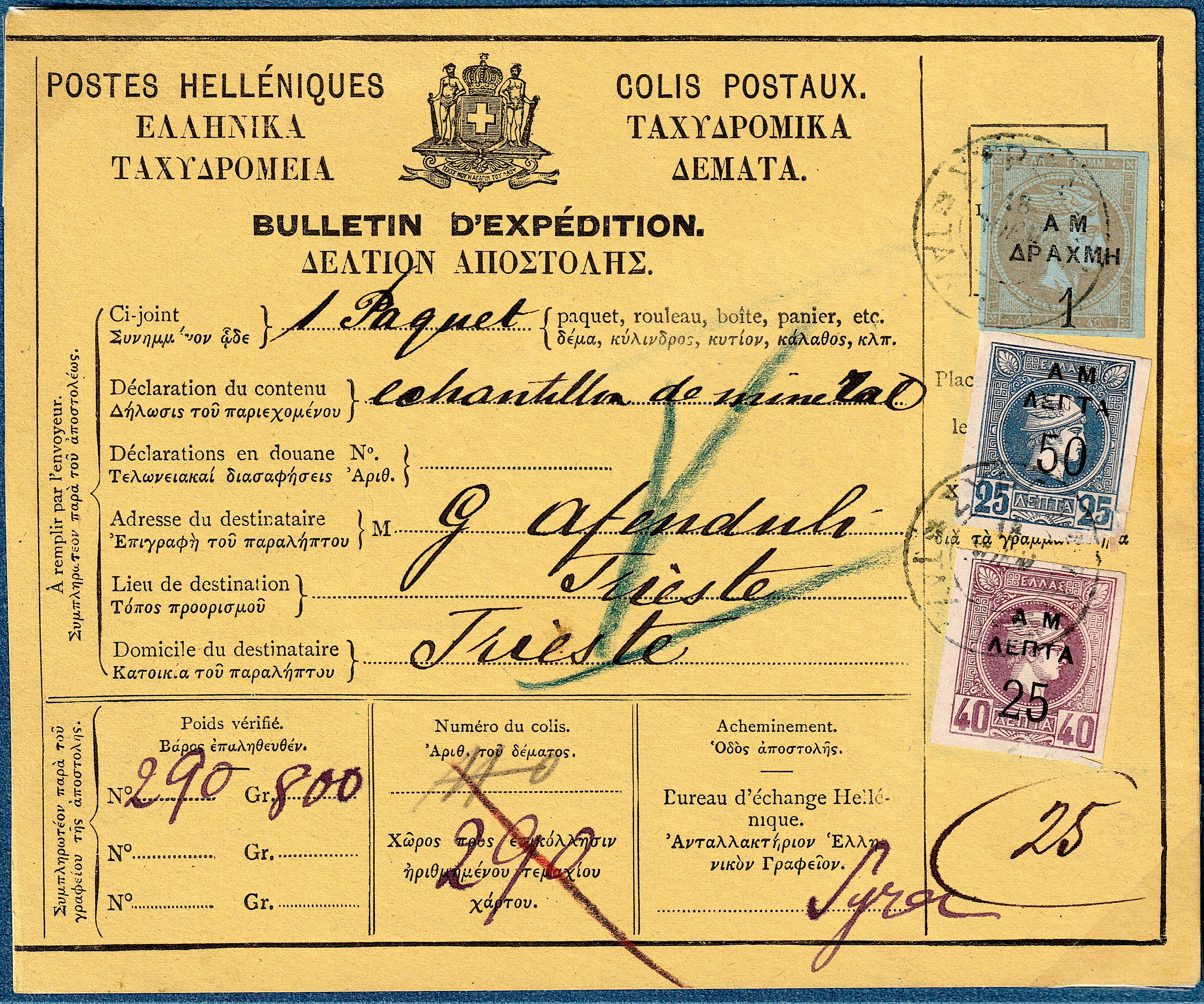

Despatch note (“Bulletin d’expédition”) for post parcels with sample of mineral sent from Syros (67 ) on November 18th/30th, 1900, arrived in Trieste, Austria-Hungary on December 5th/17th, 1900, via Piraeus (2) on November 20th/December 2nd, 1900.

Black postmark “ΤΑΧ. ΠΑΡΑΡΤ. ΠΑΡΑ ΤΩ ΤΕΛΩΝ ΠΕΙΡΑΙΩΣ” on the back.
Franked at 1 drachma & 75 lepta for a weight of 800 grams with one 1 drachma/40 lepta of the meshed papers printings of the LHH (1871/1876)and one 50 lepta/25 lepta & one 25 lepta/40 lepta, both of the Belgian printing of the “small Hermes head” (1886/1888).
The three stamps are overprinted AM or “ΑΞΙΑ ΜΕΤΑΛΛΙΧΗ” (Metal Value).

Only very few documents wearing the AM overprinted LHH exist for their real purpose: the franking of the post parcels and the postal orders. Any other usage is “philatelic”…

In October 1900, another issue was launched but that time for common usage, the values are in lepta and drachm.

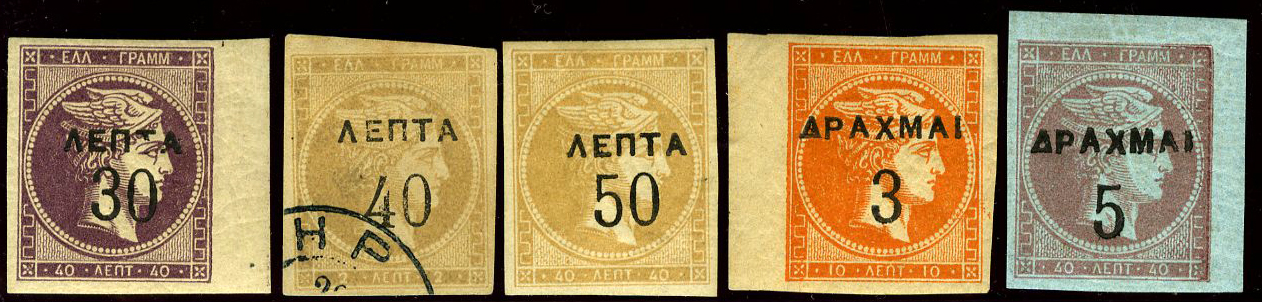
Série surchargée, usage courant, non dentelée

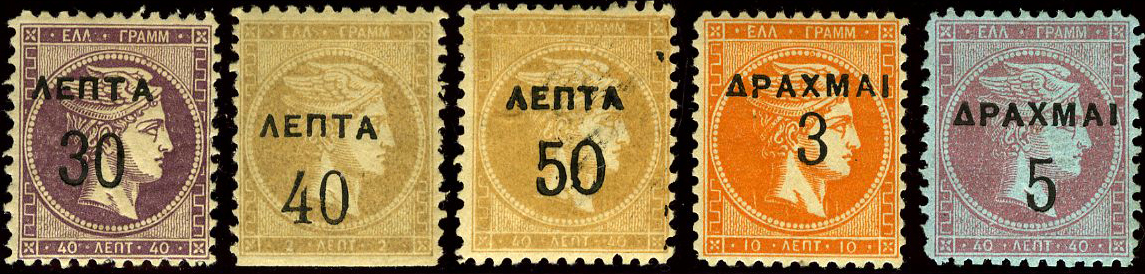
Série surchargée, usage courant, dentelée

It exists a very large number of variety of these surcharges, such as those of the: "narrow 0", "large 0", "small space", "large space"...

All these overprint issues have been removed from the selling on June 30, 1901, when the "flying Hermes" issue has been finally shipped from London.

=== The "control numbers" at the back of the "large Hermes head" ===
The majority of the "large Hermes head" has also the facial value printed on the back of the stamp:

- The 10 lepta of the Paris printing (numbers of 8 mm high),
- The 5, 10, 20, 40 & 80 lepta of all the Athens printings, to the exception of the last two ones (numbers of 6.5 mm high).

The unique writing comment existing, to this date, about these "control numbers" is the one that can be found in the post scriptum of a letter of Désiré-Albert Barre written to the Greek administration for the second shipment of the stamps and plates to Athens on September 11, 1861. In that letter the French Chief Engraver is writing: "The 10 lepta stamps, the last produced, carry on their back the printed value: 10 lepta in large sized numbers. I believed that it was necessary to apply this innovation to these stamps, this idea came to me late and which appears to offer some great advantages.". Not any single official document has been found so far allowing us to understand the exact purpose of these numbers. Several hypotheses are possible:

- a limitation of falsification,
- a better readability,
- an easier control and counting of the production and distribution,
- ...

This last hypothesis is considered by the specialists of the "large Hermes head" stamp as the most probable.
This is the reason why these figures are commonly called "control numbers".

Only a unique typographic plate has been used for the printing of the "control numbers" of the Athens issues (from 1861 to 1880).
So the degree of wear of this plate, and then the printing render of the "control numbers" is determinant for the classification of the Athens issues.
Degrees of wear of the "control numbers" of 4 Athens issues (1861, 1862/1867, 1871/1876 and 1875/1880):

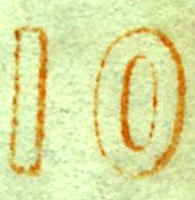
First Athens printings
(1861)

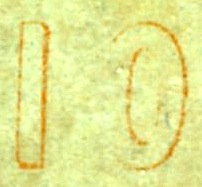
Consecutive Athens printings
(1862/1867)

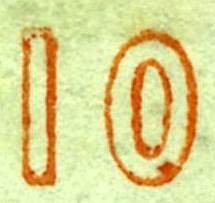
Meshed papers printings
(1871/1876)

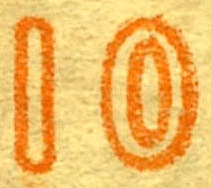
Cream papers printings
with "control numbers"
(1875/1880)

==== The "control numbers" errors of the "large Hermes head" ====
A very large number of "control numbers" errors has been identified:.

- One or the two digit(s) inverted,
- Digits swapped each other,
- Uneven digits,
- Double digit(s),
- Large space between the two digits,
- Displaced digit(s),
- Digits printed on the front of the stamp,
- ...

The number of the different types of errors, without of their combination, is very important and exists for all the printings. New "control numbers" errors are still regularly discovered by philatelists.

===== The "control numbers" errors of the 10 lepta of the Paris printing =====
These are all the referenced "control numbers" errors of the 10 lepta of the Paris printing, as well as their position on the sheet of 150 stamps:

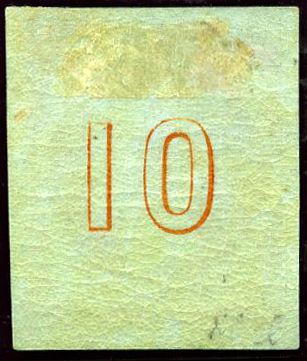
Regular
"control numbers"

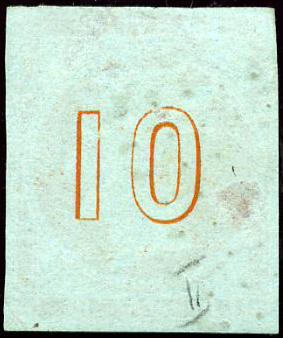
1 Inverted
(Position 86)

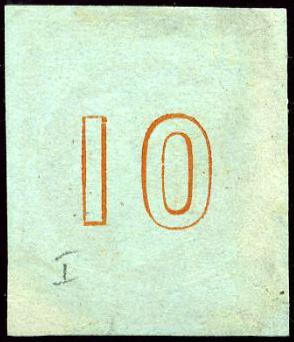
0 Inverted
(Positions 4 & 88)

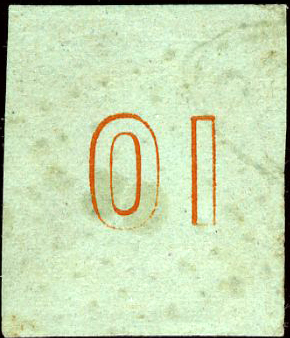
Full "control numbers" Inverted
(called "Piraeus error")

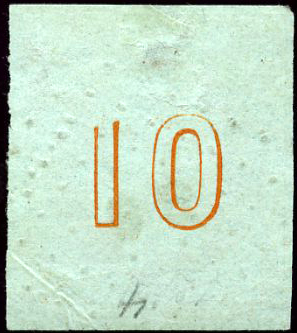
Open 1
(Position 14)

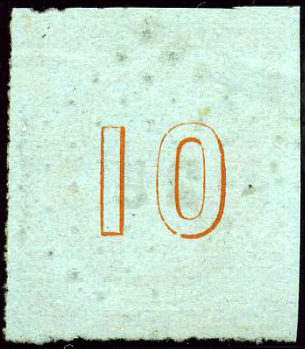
Open 0
(Position 16)

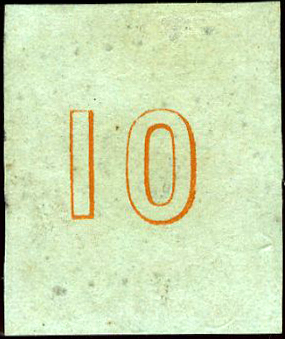
Uneven
"control numbers"
(Positions 88 & 127)

===== The "control numbers" errors of the Athens printings =====
This is just a sample of some "control numbers" errors that can be found in the Athens printings:

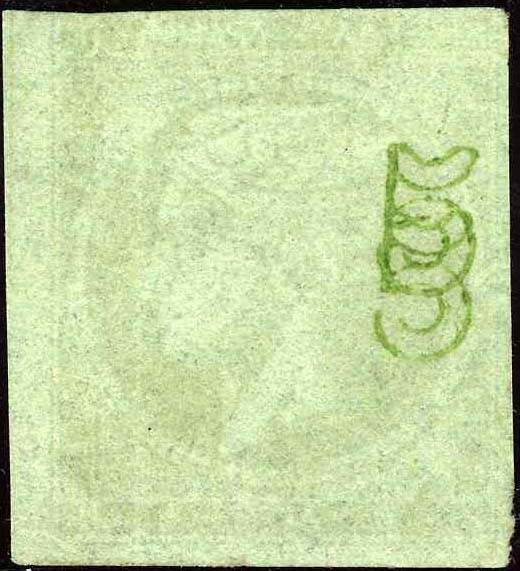
5 lepta
Double 5

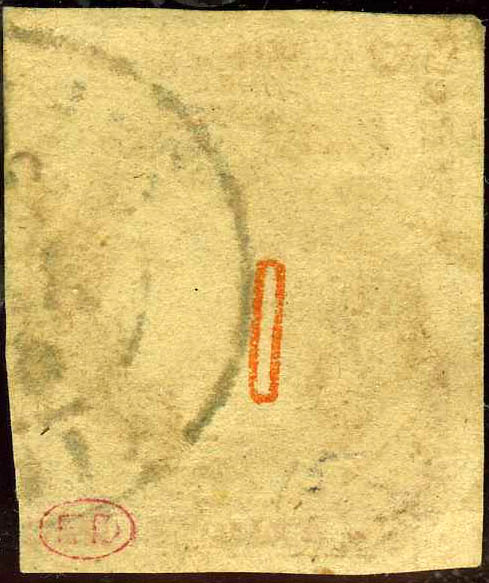
10 lepta
1 instead of 10

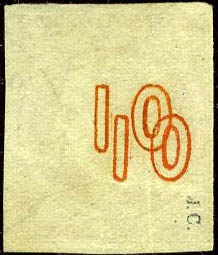
10 lepta
Double 10

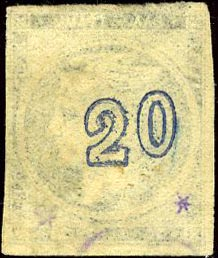
20 lepta
Uneven
"control numbers"

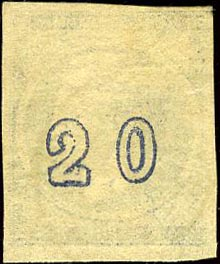
20 lepta
Large space

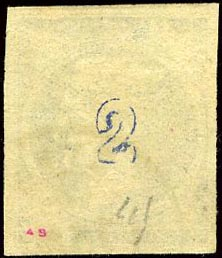
20 lepta
2 instead of 20

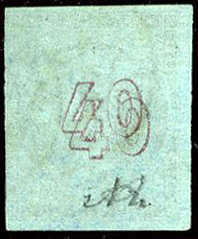
40 lepta
Double 40

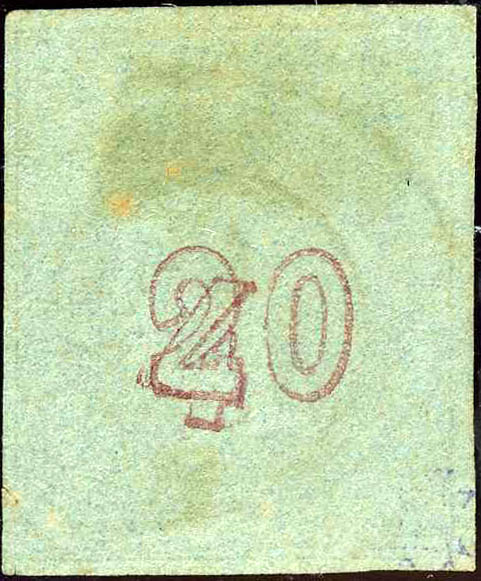
40 lepta
2 corrected with 4

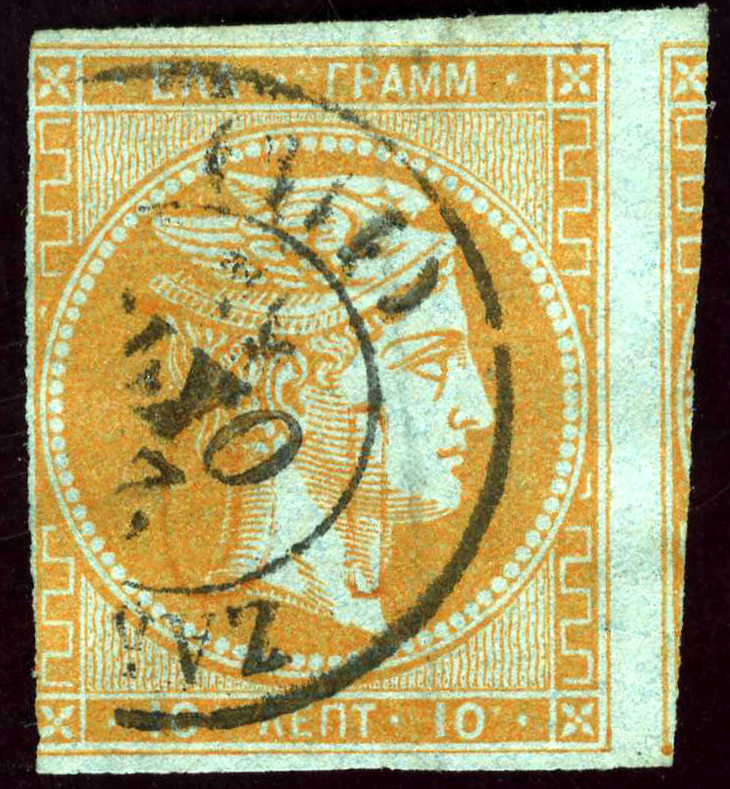
10 lepta
10 inverted & printed on the recto
(The "Zante error")

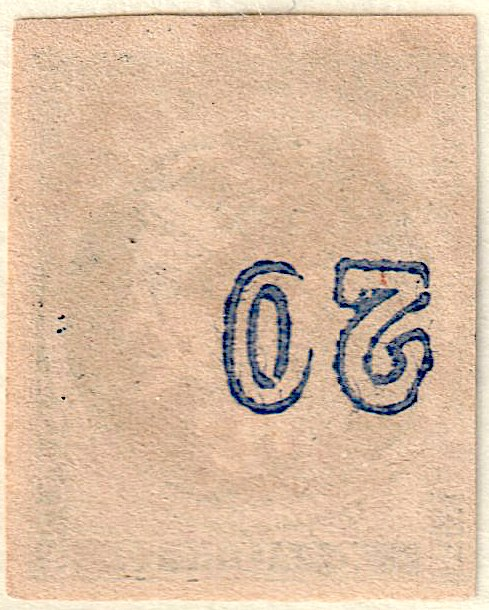
20 lepta
20 inverted
(The "Argostolion error")

=== The plate flaws of the "large Hermes head" ===
Starting with the Paris printing, in 1861, as well as on the plate-proofs, plate flaws are found, coming from small imperfections of some of the "clichés" of the typographic plates.

Some of these plate flaws are native and have appeared during the manufacturing process of the plates (see the first three illustrations below), and some others are appearing, coming either from wrong manipulations (see the last three illustrations, below), or from a dirtying of the plates (ink spots), during the life of the plates. In this last case they could also disappear after the cleaning of the plates (see the two 1 lepton below).

This is just a sample of some plate flaws that can be found on the "large Hermes head" stamps:

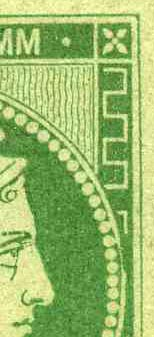
Plate flaw of the
narrow circle
(5 lepta - Position 51)

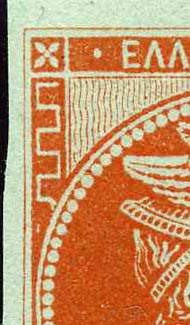
Plate flaw of the
Greek touching the circle
(10 lepta - Position 107)

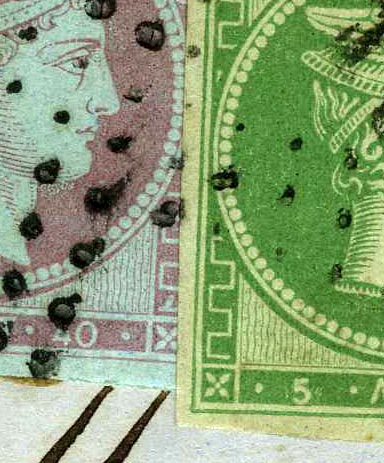
Plate flaw of the
hook to the Greek
(40 lepta - Position 67)

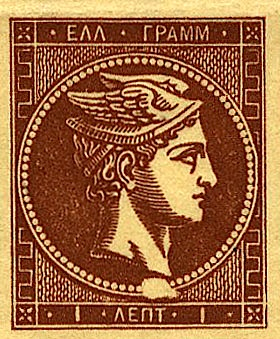
Plate flaw of the
spot to the neck
(1 lepton - Position 44)

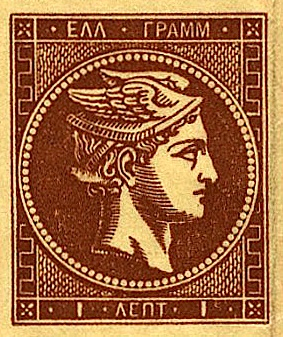
Plate flaw of the
spot to the nape
(1 lepton - Position 55)

The 30 lepta error ("Hermes with a pipe") is due to a damage of the printing plate:

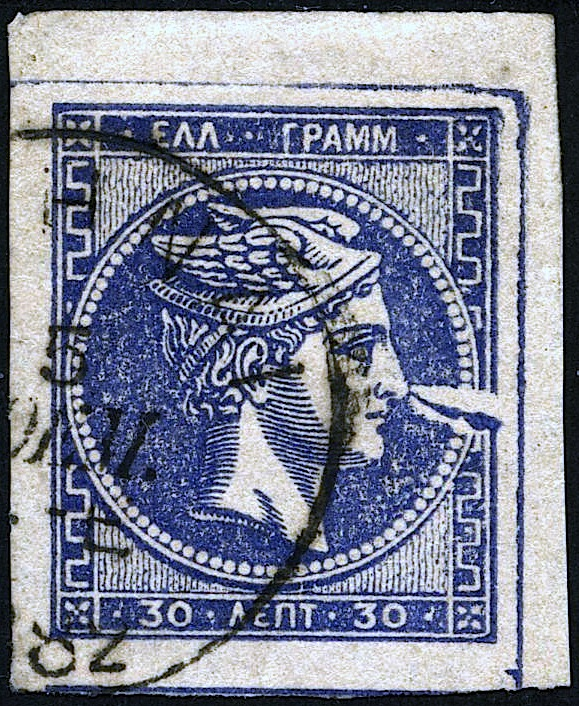
Plate flaw of the
Hermes with the pipe
(30 lepta - Position 10)

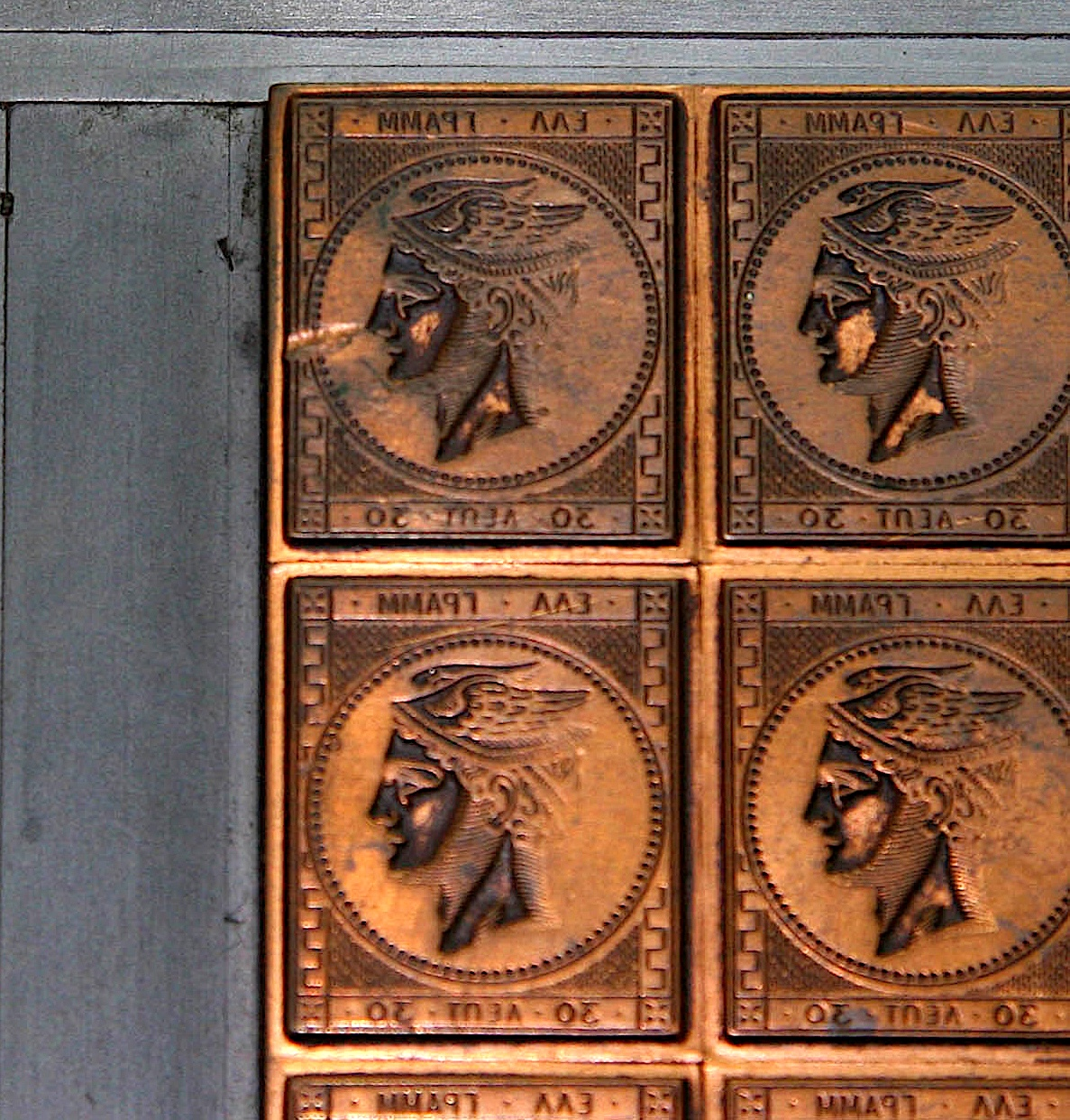
Plate of the 30 lepta
(Positions: 10-9 / 20-19)
Postal Museum of Athens

The plate flaws exist for all the values of all the printings and their number is very important. Here again, a specific collection is totally justifiable.

=== The forgeries/fakes of the "large Hermes head" stamps ===
As all the classical stamps, the "large Hermes head" have been counterfeited and that as early as the 1860s.
It exists a large number of fakes done during the 19th century and during the first part of the 20th century. These stamps have been the target of forgers, including Erasmo Oneglia, Jean de Sperati and A. Alisaffi.

This is just a sample of some forgeries/fakes of the "large Hermes head" stamps:

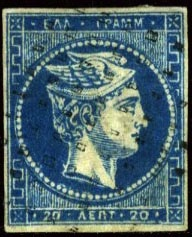
Fake of the Spiro brothers in Hamburg (1860s)

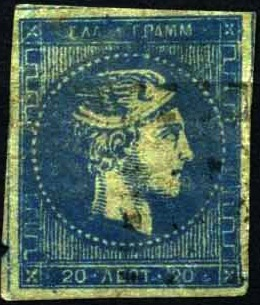
Fake called "Poor sad Hermes" of Spiro brothers (1860s)

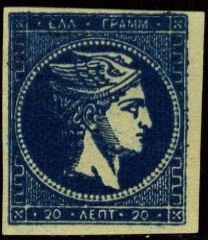
Fake of Alissafi of Constantinopolis (1900s)

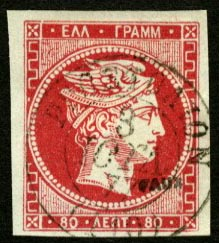
Fake of Fournier (1910s)

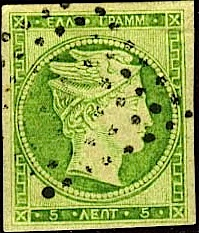
Fake of Oneglia (1920s)

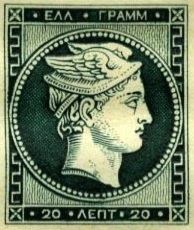
Fake of a die-proof
Detail - (1970s)

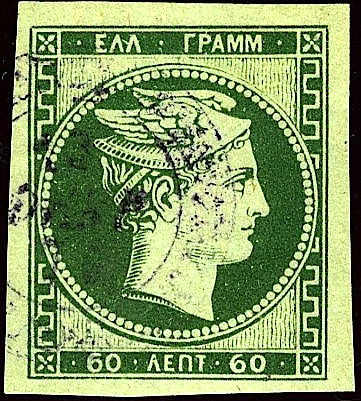
Fake of Imperato,
called "Genoa fake" (1950s)

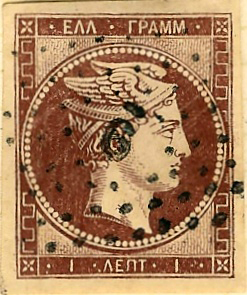
Fake of Jean de Spérati (1930s)

All the printings of the plate-proofs and the stamps of "large Hermes head" have the first wavy line broken at their base in the north-west spandrel.

It's also the case for the tenth wavy line of the same spandrel (see the illustration below).

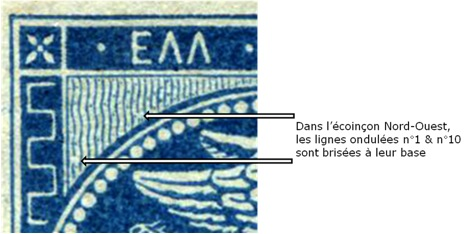
How to recognise a genuine "large Hermes head"?

These breaks are coming from a problem that happened to the final die or to a service die during either the process of:

- Striking, or,
- Hardening.

Indeed, these breaks are not appearing on the progressive and final proofs (to the exception of the only numeral proof known today and which have been realised at the end of the process).

It exists the same type of "small problems" on some French classical stamps build in the middle of the 19th century, in the same French Mint, under the responsibility of the Chief Engravers: Jacques-Jean Barre, then his son, Désiré-Albert Barre, who has also realised the dies and the typographic plates of the "large Hermes head" of Greece.

The existence or the absence of these two breaks are warrantying if the "large Hermes head" stamp is genuine or not in almost all the cases...

Only the Jean de Sperati fakes, which have been realised with a photo-lythography method, and which are then a picture of an original stamp, are presenting these two same breaks at the same places.

=== The postal stationeries - "Cartes-correspondance" (1876-1900) ===
==== The Paris printing (April 1876) ====
In 1875, at the same time of the 30 & 60 lepta stamps order, the Greek postal administration asked to Désiré-Albert Barre to realize the necessary equipment to print the first postal stationery (carte-correspondence) of the Kingdom.

For the realization of the die of the effigy of the stamp of the postal stationery, the Chief-Engraver took the same medallion-die used, in 1861, to create the large Hermes head stamps and engraved a new framework (see the illustrations of the pre-project and the mock-up, below).

Like for the 30 & 60 lepta stamps, the Chief-Engraver supervised the company: Charles-Dierrey, 6 & 12, rue Notre-Dame-des-Champs in Paris, on the manufacturing of the postal stationery typographic plate, composed of 24 pure copper "clichés", by using a galvanic method.

And like for the 30 & 60 lepta stamps, the sheets were printed in typography on Bristol paper, by the company: J. Claye & Cie, 7, rue Saint Benoît, in Paris, on April 13 & 14, 1876.

5.000, or 8.000, sheets of 24 postal stationaries (cartes-correspondence) with 15 lepta value have been printed. The documents exchanged between Désiré-Albert Barre and the Greek government, are indeed contradictories regarding the exact quantity ordered: 5.000 or 8.000 sheets (?)

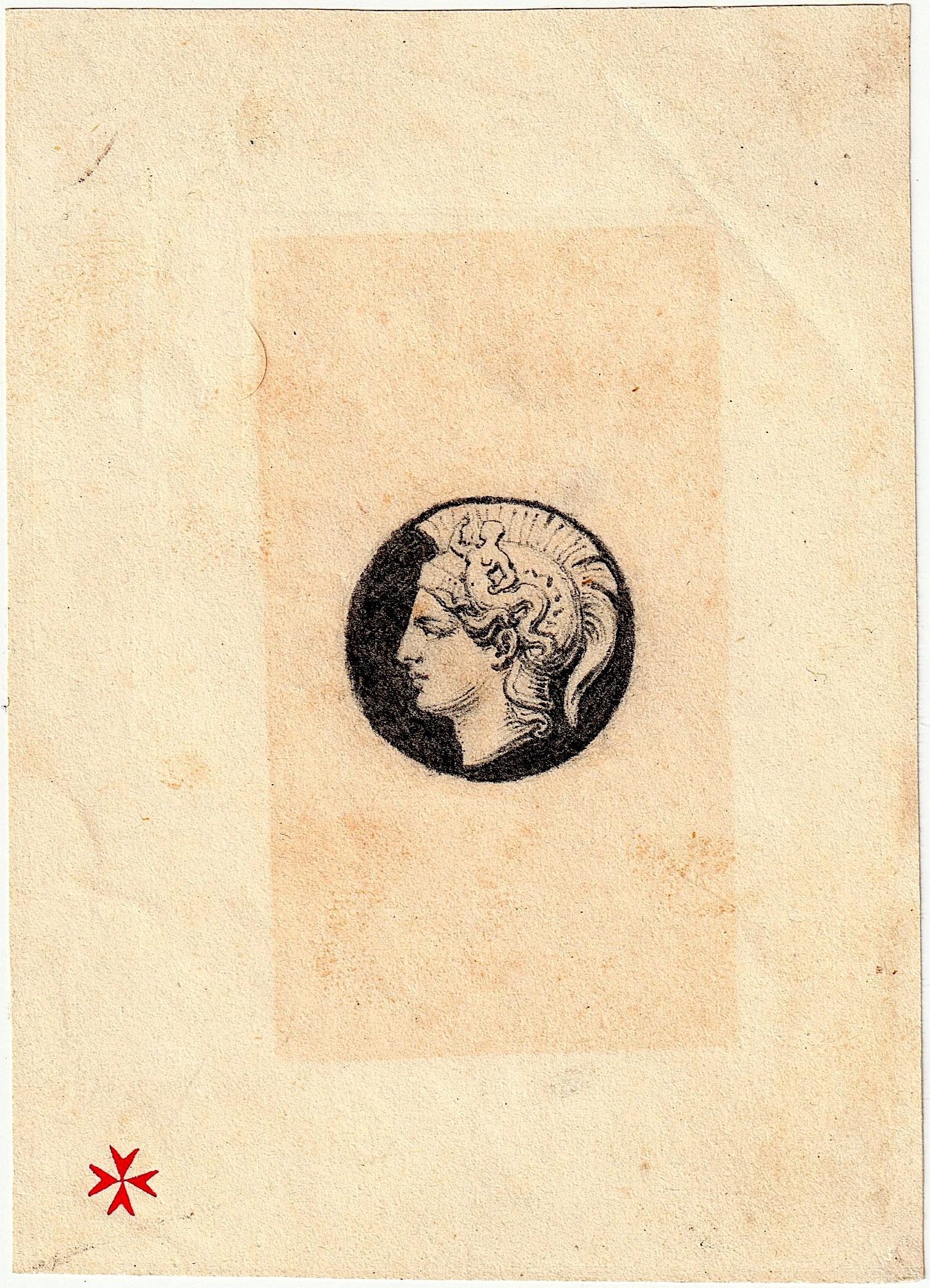
Drawing research of the effigy
of the postal stationery (Athena)

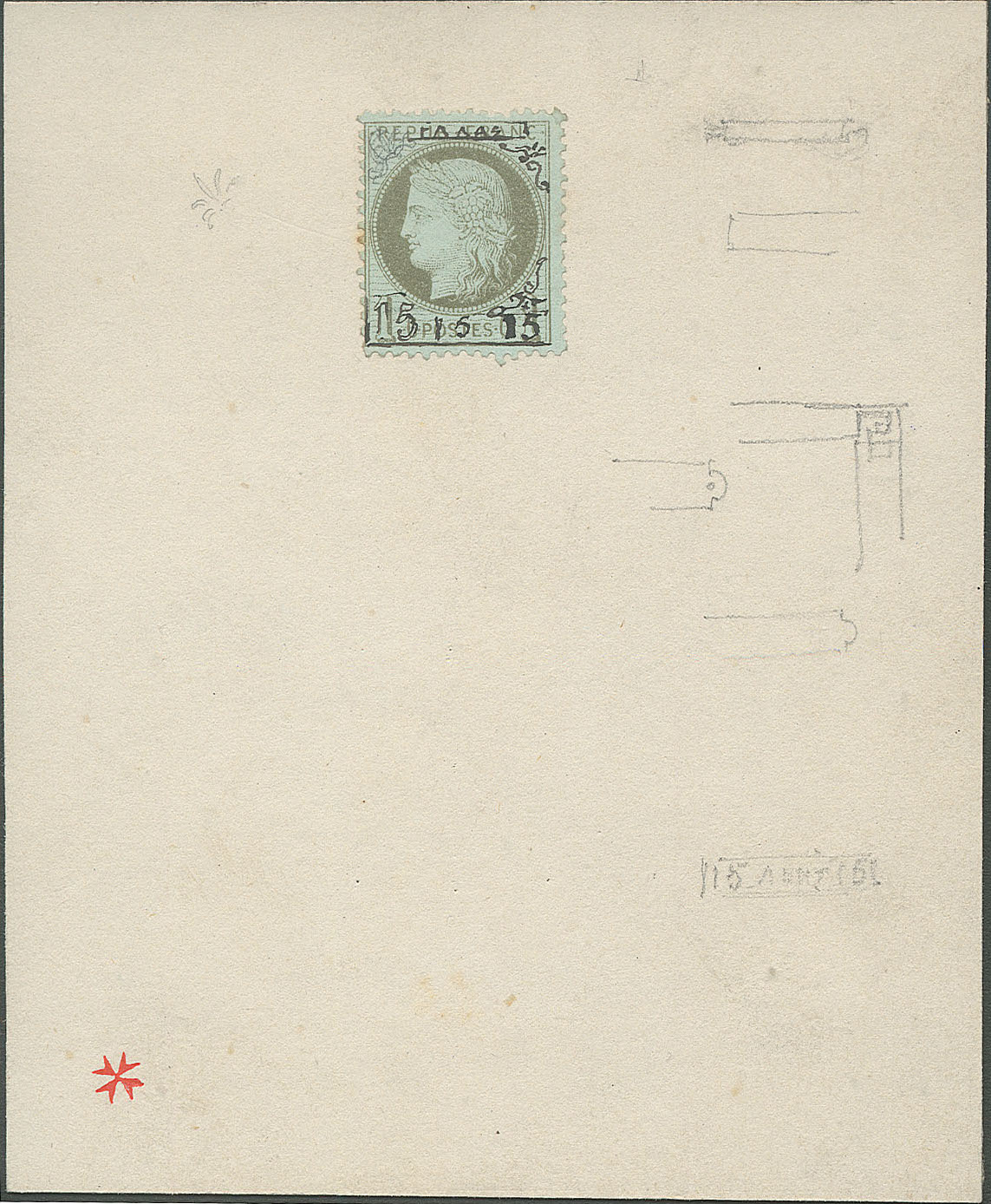
The pre-project
of the postal stationery

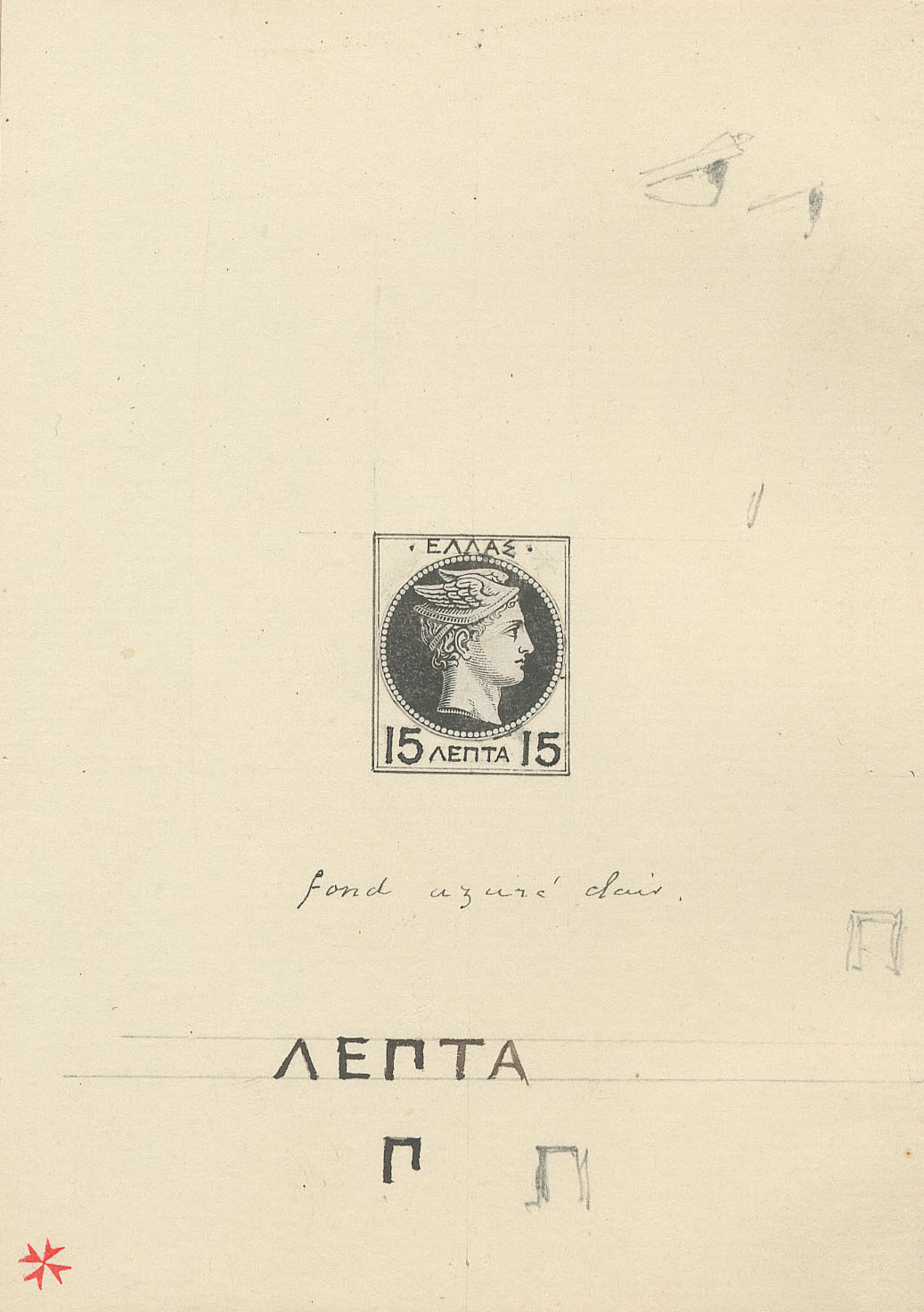
The mock-up
of the postal stationery

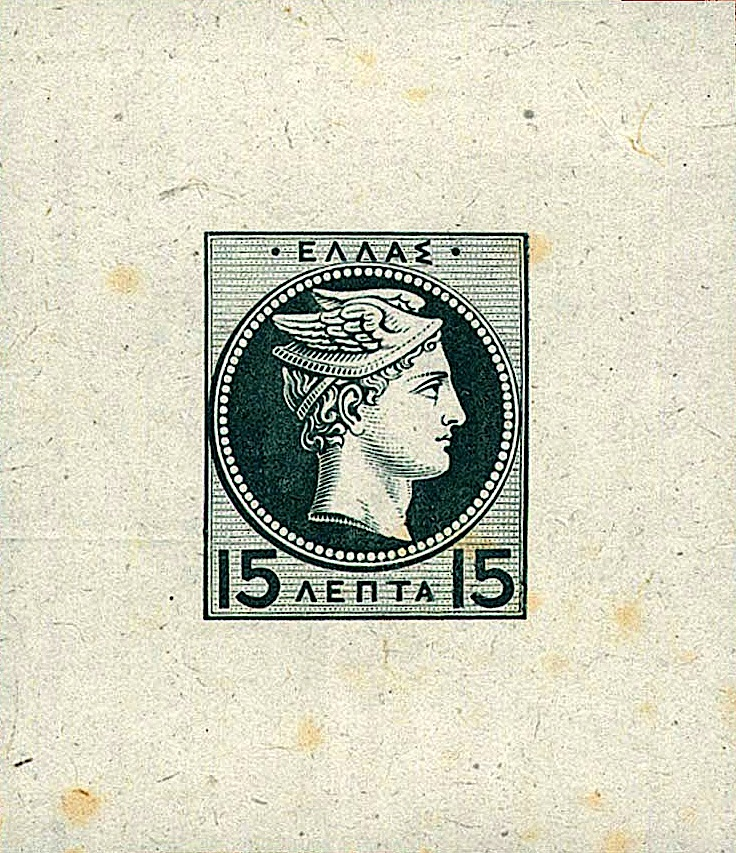
Die-proof
of the postal stationery

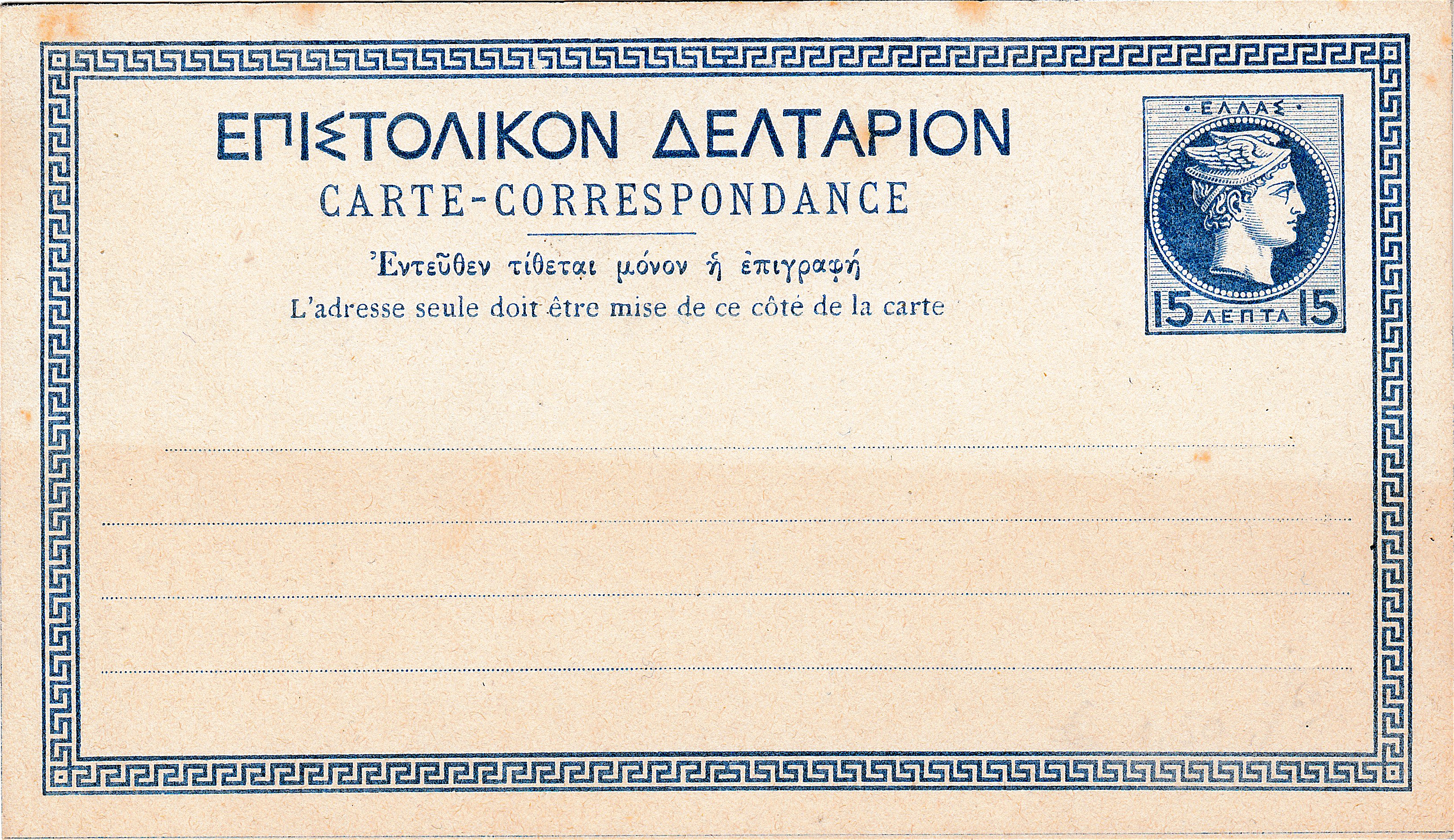
Postal stationery
(Carte-correspondence)
of Paris printing (1876) type II

It exists two types of the 1876 Paris printing postal stationery:

- The type I: The horizontal line under "Carte-correspondance" is of 14,5 mm length, and,
- The type II: The horizontal line under "Carte-correspondance" is of 16,0 mm length.

==== The first Athens printing (1878) ====
After the stock depletion of the Paris printing, a second emission, of the 15 lepta value and in blue, has been printed in Athens in 1878.

As for the stamps of 1861 and 1876, the printings done in Athens are coarser than the ones of the Paris printing.

Here also, it exists two types with the same characteristics of those of the Paris printing.

==== The Belgium printing (July 1st 1883) ====
At the same time as the printing of the values of the 25, lepta, 50 lepta and of the 1 drachme of the small Hermes head (see below), the Greek postal administration asked the "Atelier du timbre" of Malines in Belgium to print the postal stationaries of the values of 5 & 10 lepta in blue, red and grey-green colors.

Due to the extensive use of the 10 lepta value, double postal stationeries of this value have been also printed.

==== The second Athens printings (1890–1900) ====
Starting 1890, the Greek postal administration printed in Athens the postal stationeries of the values of 5 & 10 lepta in blue, black and red colors.

The same plates than the ones of the first Athens printings were used. The printings are even coarser than the first Athens printing of 1878.

On top of the Karamitsos/Hellas Volume V of 2013, one catalog is also referencing the Greek postal stationeries: George Stratoudakis, Greece Postal Stationery, Athens, 1985.

== The "small Hermes head" (1886 to 1899) ==
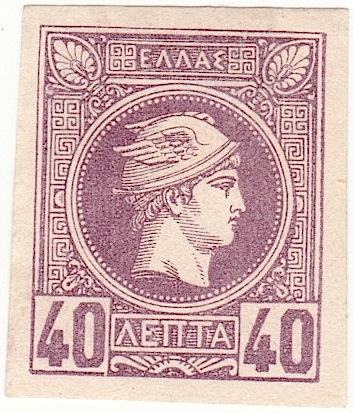
40 Lepta of the Belgium printings of the "small Hermes head"

The second type of the Greek posts is also with the Hermes effigy. It is called the "small Hermes head" and has been issued from 1886 to 1899. They depict Hermes in profile, but with a smaller head and a rounder helmet. The design was by Henri Hendrickx (1817–1894) and it was engraved by Albert Doms, Atelier de Timbre, Belgium. The typographic plates counted 300 stamps, sub-divided in six panels of 50 stamps (5 × 10) mounted in two columns of three rows.

The stamps of the "small Hermes head" are non-perforated as well as perforated, with different perforations (13 & ½, 11 & ½ and 13 & ¼). It exists also stamps with perforation of 15, but unofficially, probably perforated with a sewing machine inside the premise of the Amfissa Branch of the National bank of Greece. They are called the Amfissa perforated.

Like the "large Hermes head" stamps, the "small Hermes head" stamps have been also overprinted in 1900 with the two overprinted issues (Metal value and common usage).

The 50 lepta stamp was not reprinted. The stamps were produced using the gravure method, using printing plates of 300 stamps in 6 groups of 50 stamps. Initially the sheets were imperforate. Perforated versions, initially 13½ and later 11½, became available in 1891.

=== The Belgium printings (1886 to 1888) ===
The first printing has been done at the "atelier du timbre" in Malines, in Belgium. The first three denominations (25 lepta, 50 lepta and 1 drachma) were issued on April 1. The remaining denominations (1 lepton, 2, 5, 10, 20 and 40 lepta) were issued on February 1, 1888. Value and colour of the nine values of the Belgium printings of the "small Hermes head":

Value	Colour
1 lepton	brown
2 lepta	bistre
5 lepta	yellow-green
10 lepta	orange
20 lepta	red
25 lepta	blue
40 lepta	purple
50 lepta	olive-green
1 drachme	grey

=== The Athens printings (1889 to 1899) ===
The consecutive printings have been done in Athens and are sub-divided in two main periods:

- The 1st period, from March 1889 to March 1891, with two types of paper, and,
- the 2nd period, from March 1891 to April 1896, with two other types of paper.

== The first Olympic games issue (1896) ==
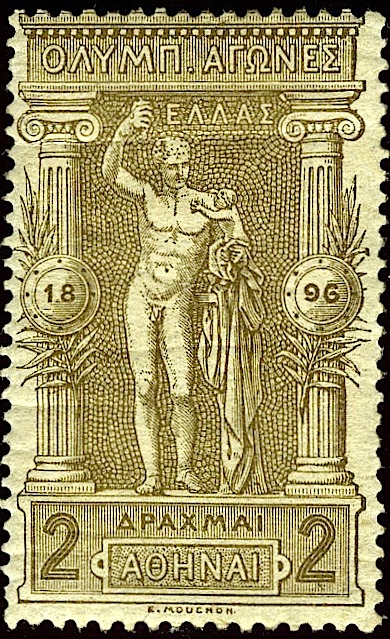
2 drachms of the first Olympic games issue of 1896

In 1896, Greece issued its first commemorative stamps set for the first summer Olympic games of 1896 of the modern era. The stamps of this issue have been designed in Paris. The French engraver Louis-Eugène Mouchon realised the dies.

The issue is counting twelve values representing allegories of the antic Olympic games. One of these twelve values, the two drachms in large format, represents a Hermes statue inspired by Praxiteles.

== After 1899 ==
=== The "Flying Hermes" (1901) ===
In 1901, a fourth representation of Hermes is appearing on the post-stamps of the Kingdom of Greece. The utilised figure that time is a statue from the sculptor of the 16th century, Jean Boulogne, or Giovanni da Bologna or, Giambologna: the "flying Hermes". This fourteen values issue, perforated in three different types (a, b et c) has been realised by the English printer J. P. Segg & Co in London.

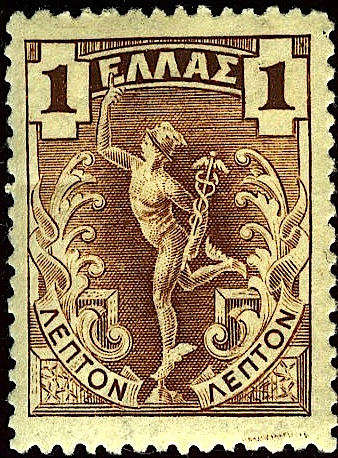
"Flying Hermes" - Type a

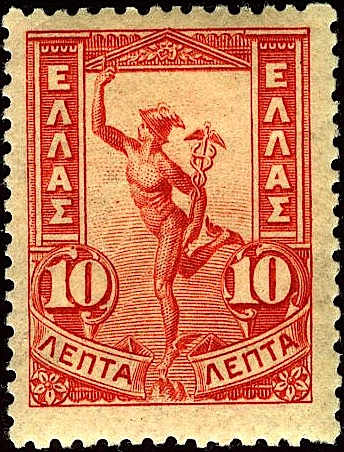
"Flying Hermes" - Type b

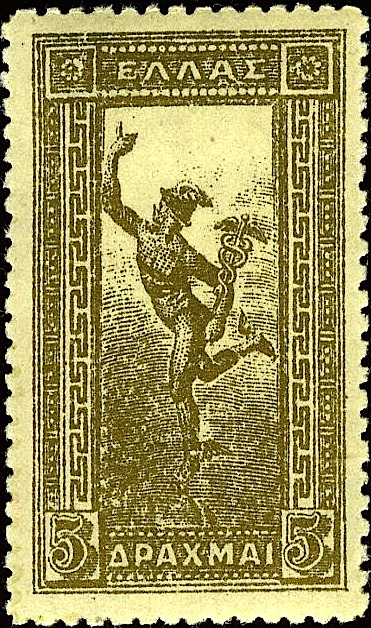
"Flying Hermes" - Type c

Value and colour of the fourteen values of the "flying Hermes" set:

Value	Colour	Type
1 lepton	brown	a
2 lepta	grey	a
3 lepta	orange	a
5 lepta	green	b
10 lepta	red	b
20 lepta	purple	a
25 lepta	deep-blue	b
30 lepta	violet	a
40 lepta	black-brown	a
50 lepta	red-brown	a
1 drachme	black	c
2 drachme	bronze	c
3 drachme	silver	c
5 drachme	gold	c

=== The Hermes with Metal Values (1902) ===
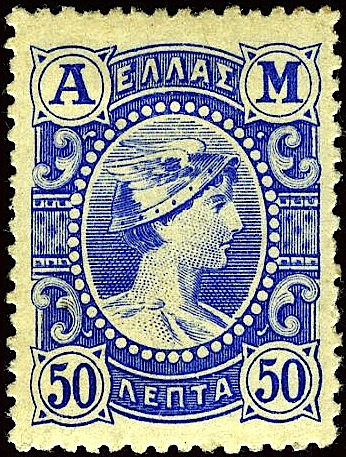
Hermes, métallic value - 50 lepta, blue

In 1902, the Greek postal administration issued a set of five stamps with the same effigy, perforated 13 & ½, for the payment in medal money (golden drachma) for the international parcels shipment with the mention AM for "Αξια Μεταλλιχη" for "Metal Value". These stamps have been printed in England by Perkins Bacon & Co.

The five values are:

- Le 5 lepta, orange,
- Le 25 lepta, green,
- Le 50 lepta, blue,
- Le 1 drachm, red, and,
- Le 2 drachms, brown.

The 50 lepta, red is a "non-émis".

This set was issued for the international mailing, in particular for the parcels and the postal orders ("mandats"), but will be also used for the common usage. The complete sheet was counting one hundred stamps.

=== The definitive sets with the effigy of Hermes (1911 to 1926) ===
In 1911, a new set, with various effigies of the God Hermes, was issued. The stamps are perforated in zigzag (13 X 13 & ¼). This new set is initially, in 1911, printed by using the line-engraving technic ("taille douce"), then reissued in 1919, still in line-engraving, and then again in 1919–1923 but that time in lithography, and finally, still in lithography in 1926 (Vienna emission) . All these issues have been overprinted in many cases up to 1920:

- in 1912–1913: overprinted ΕΛΛΗΝΙΚΙ ΔΙΟΙΚΗΣΙΣ, with black and red inks, reading-up and reading-down,
- in 1912–1913: overprinted ΛΗΜΝΟΣ, with black and red inks, et,
- in 1916: overprinted ΕΤ for Ελληνικά Ταχυδομεία (Hellenic posts), with black and red inks.

Value, colour and type of the sixteen stamps of common usage set, printed in "taille douce" in 1911 :

Value	Colour	Type
1 lepton	green	a
2 lepta	red	Iris
3 lepta	orange	a
5 lepta	green	b
10 lepta	red	a
20 lepta	purple	Iris
25 lepta	blue	Iris
30 lepta	red	b
40 lepta	blue on blue	Iris
50 lepta	violet	b
1 drachme	blue	c
2 drachme	orange	c
3 drachme	red	c
5 drachme	blue	c
10 drachme	deep blue on blue	c
25 drachme	blue on blue	AA

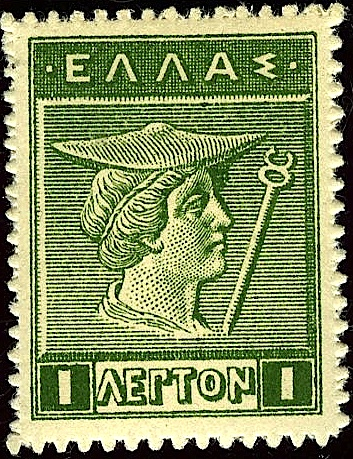
Hermes, type a

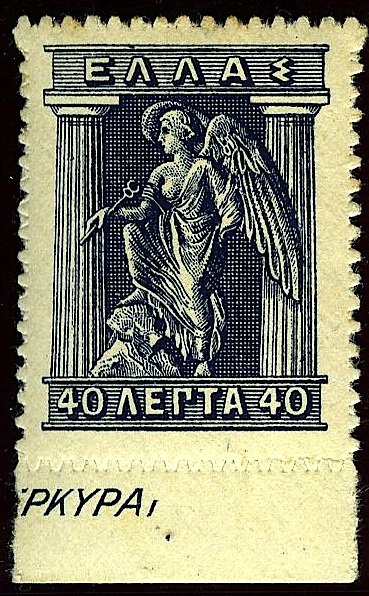
Iris

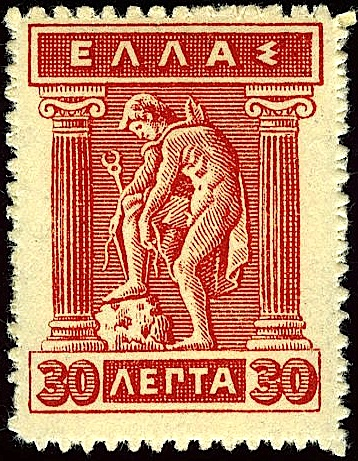
Hermes, type b

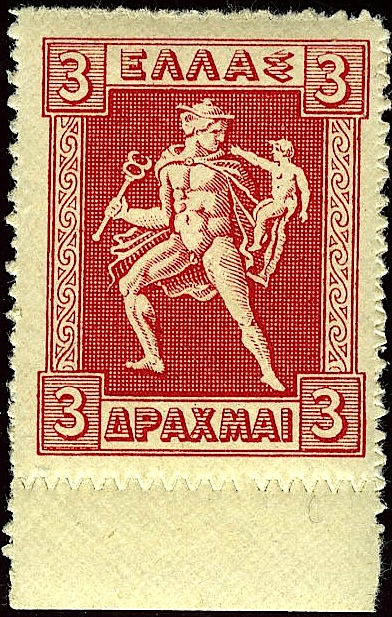
Hermes, type c

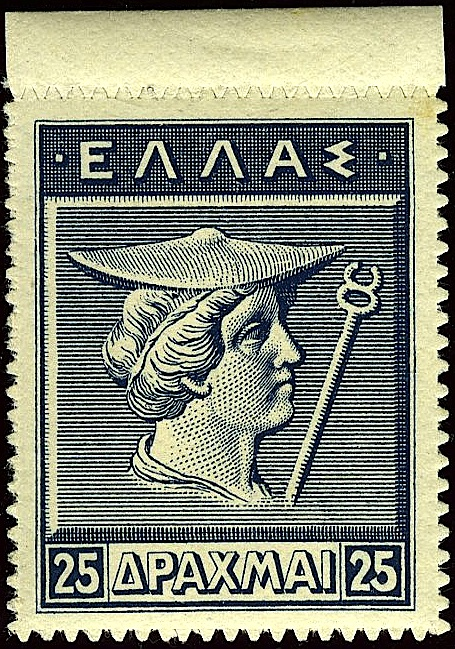
Hermes, type AA

== Bibliography (Large Hermes Heads) ==
- Natalis Rondot, Les timbres-poste – Royaume de Grèce, Le Magasin Pittoresque, XXXIIème année, Paris 1864.
- Arthur E. Glasewald, Die Postwerthzeichen von Griechenland, Gössnitz 1896.
- Yvert et Tellier, Catalogue prix-courant - Timbres-Poste, Amiens 1897.
- Walter Dorning Beckton & G. Duerst The stamps of Greece, Plymouth 1897.
- Crawford Capen, The Stamps of Greece, American Journal of Philately, pages 219-223, 255-260, 287-290 & 332-334, New York 1901.
- Alfred Montader, Classification des Timbres Grecs, Le Postillon n° 9 (pages 65-68), n° 10 (pages 73-76) & n° 11 (pages 81-83), Paris 1902.
- Adolf Reinheimer, Concise description of the essays of Martin Schroeder, Leipzig 1903.
- Pierre Mahé, Reminiscences of a veteran - The Stamps of Greece, Stanley Gibbons Monthly Journal, Volume no. XVII, London 1906 & 1907.
- Arthur Maury, Histoire des timbres-poste français, Paris, 1907.
- Pierre Mahé, Souvenirs d’un Timbrophile - Les Timbres Grecs, L’Echo de la Timbrologie nos. 369-370, Paris 1908.
- Georges Brunel, Les émissions des timbres grecs, Paris 1909.
- Percival Loines Pemberton, The stamps of Greece, Philatelic journal of Great Britain, 1911 & 1912.
- N. S. Nicolaïdès, Description, Historique et Catalogue des Timbres Grecs, Paris 1911 & 1913.
- A. Lavenir, Les Oblitérations Grecques, Amiens 1916.
- Fred J. Melville, Postage Stamps in the Making, London 1916.
- J. Briault & Nikolaos Garas, Grèce - Etude & catalogue - Prix courant, La Celle Saint Cloud 1921.
- N. S. Nicolaïdès, Histoire de la création du timbre grec, Paris 1923.
- Theodore Groom, The controls of the 20 lepta and their bearing on the classification of Greek stamps of the first type, Philotelia n° 3 & 4 of March 1924.
- Paul de Smeth, Grèce, Premier type, Histoire, Classement, Essais, Oblitérations, Amiens 1925.
- Joseph H. Pullen, A comparative check list of the "Hermes" type stamps of Greece, Los Angeles 1927.
- George Brunel, Le Classement des timbres grecs. 1re émission, 1861-1885, Paris 1929.
- Luder-Edelmann, Grèce - Marquis Ferrari de la Renotière, auction catalogue, Zurich, April 1929.
- Luder-Edelmann, XIIIte auction catalogue, Zurich, November 1929.
- Nicolas Garas, Une trouvaille unique, Philotelia n° 54, 1929.
- Alex. G. Argyropoulos and Dr. Herbert Mund: Griechenland. In: Kohl Briefmarken-Handbug, Berlin 1929/1931.
- Alexander J. Séfi, An introduction to advanced philately, Rowley & Rowley Limited, London 1932.
- Tryphon Constantinidès, Etude sur les timbres-poste de la Grèce - 1ère Partie, Hellenic Philatelic Society Athens 1933.
- Brig.-Gen. W.E.R. Dickson, Some notes on the first type of Greece, Philately in Scotland Vol. II, n° 7 to 10, Scotland 1934.
- Constantinos Deïlakis, Grèce - Catalogue spécialisé, Paris 1936 & 1938.
- Docteur Pierre Bouvet, La commande à la Monnaie de Paris des timbres grecs à tête de Mercure, Paris 1937.
- Tryphon Constantinidès, Etude sur les timbres-poste de la Grèce - 2ème Partie, Hellenic Philatelic Society, Athens 1937.
- Robert O. Truman, A primer of the first Greek postage stamps, The stamp Specialist - Blue Book, pages 73/108, New York, 1941.
- J. Easton, Postage stamps in the making (Fred J. Melville), Faber and Faber Ltd, London 1948.
- Ernest W. Spink & Robert O. Truman, Greece - Large Hermes Heads, Billig's Specalized Catalogues - Volume 4, New York, 1949.
- Elias Silberstein & Robert O. Truman, Translation from the Kohl Briefmarken Handbuch of Alex G. Argyropulos & Dr. Herbert Munk of 1929, New York 1943–1944 & 1950.
- Nicolas G. Garas, Grèce - Grosse tête de Mercure - Les variétés des planches des timbres-poste (1861 - 1882), Athens 1955.
- J. C. Coutsis, The Greek post offices & their postmarks from 1861 to 1900, Athens 1959.
- Moses C. Constantinis, The Philatelic Press in Greece (Periodicals, Catalogs and Philatelic Studies), Reprinted from The Philatelic Litterature Review of Passaic, New Jersey - USA - Vol. 9, pp. 3-8 (Summer 1960), Athens 1961.
- George M. Photiadis, The first Athens issue of the large Hermes heads of Greece, London 1965.
- George M. Photiadis, The imprint "Typographie Ernest Meyer, Rue de Verneuil 22, à Paris" on the sheets of the large Hermes heads of Greece printed in Paris (1861), London 1969.
- Jean L. Angot, Les premiers timbres français de Jacques-Jean Barre, Le Vieux Papier n° 257/Juillet 1975/pp. 329-336, n° 258/Octobre 1975/pp. 383-390 & n° 259/Janvier 1976/pp. 423-434, Paris 1975/1976.
- Henri Regnoul-Barre, Les Barre, graveurs généraux des Monnaies, créateurs des premiers timbres-poste français et grecs, Paris 1978.
- Ulysse Bellas, La tête de Mercure: Généralités et reconstruction de la planche des 20 lepta, Paris 1978.
- Eustratios Phaippeas, A simple practcal method of identifying the various issues of the Large Hermes Heads, Athens 1978.
- Jean-François Brun, Les premiers timbres grecs ou la mystérieuse histoire de Mercure, Le Monde des Philatélistes n° 369, Paris 1983.
- Michael Kaitatzidis, Plate Flaws of the Large Hermes Heads, Mytilini 1984.
- Damian N. Andronicus, Printing the large head of Hermes - A personal view, Bulletin of the Hellenic Philatelic Society of Great Britain, 1985.
- George Stratoudakis, Greece Postal Stationery, Athens, 1985.
- Michael Kaitatzidis, Identification charts for the Large Hermes Heads, Mytilini 1985.
- Ulysse Bellas, Les cachets classiques d'Athènes, Tome I/III, Paris, 1986.
- Joachim Erhardt, Die Ferrary-Auktionen, Stuttgart 1987.
- Ulysse Bellas, Grèce - La première carte-correspondance, Le Monde des Philatélistes n° 427, Paris 1989.
- Ulysse Bellas, Grèce - L’Emission de 1876 de la Grosse Tête de Mercure, Le Monde des Philatélistes n° 428 & 429, Paris 1989.
- Orestis G. Vlastos, COMPARISONS of Hellenic Postal Stamps 1861 - 1923, Athens 1992.
- Constantin Mattheos, The Large Hermes Heads, 1861-1886, The Collectors Club Philatelist Volume 74/Number 6/pp. 347-365, Volume 75/Number 1/pp. 31-42, Volume 75/Number 2/pp. 95-110, Volume 75/Number 3/pp. 171-180 & Volume 75/Number 4/pp. 225-247, New York 1995/1996.
- Nicholas Asymakopulos, The plate flaws of the large Hermes heards of Greece, 1861 - 1886, USA 1995.
- Rienk M. Feenstra, Greece - a collection of forgeries, second edition, Amsterdam, 1997.
- Constantin Mattheos, Les Grosses Têtes d'Hermès, 1861-1886, Philatélie Magazine n° 1/pp. 17-28, n° 2/pp. 18-25, n° 3/pp. 18-25, n° 4/pp. 20-25 & n° 5/pp. 14-23, Paris 1999/2000.
- John G. Coundouros, The control numbers & the classification of the stamps of the large Hermes head, Athens 2000.
- Nicholas Asymakopulos, Greece: Hulot's proofs of the large Hermes Heads, The London Philatelist (RPSL), volume 109, N° 1271, pp. 31-41, London 2000.
- Louis Basel, The Ten Lepta Large Hermes Head Stamp of Greece, Stamford 2001–2005 <Large Hermes Head Stamps>.
- David Feldman, The Collection (I to VII), auction catalogues, Genève 2002/2006.
- Anthony B. Virvilis, Handbook of the Hellenic philately, Athens 2003.
- David Feldman, The Grand Prix Collection (I), auction catalogue, Genève 2003.
- Louis Basel, The Forty Lepta Large Hermes Head Stamp of Greece, Stamford 2004 <Large Hermes Head Stamps>.
- Nicholas Asymakopulos, The first Greek stamp, USA 2005.
- Louis Basel, The underlay used in printing the Large Hermes head stamps of Greece, Stamford 2005 <Large Hermes Head Stamps>.
- Nicholas Asymakopulos, Barre's Secret Mark on the Large Hermes Heads of Greece, The London Philatelist (RPSL), volume 114, N° 1331, pp. 389-396, London 2005.
- Jan Mancini, The 1900 Overprints, Vlastos Editions, Athens 2007.
- Louis Fanchini, Definition of the terms "PROOF" and "ESSAY" and their application to the large Hermes head stamps, Philotelia n° 644 of May/June 2007, pp. 133–145. See Lou Basel web site: https://web.archive.org/web/20151002141114/http://hermesheads.home.comcast.net/~hermesheads/
- Louis Fanchini, Large Hermes heads Paris printing: The exact quantities ordered and shipped to Athens, Philotelia n° 646 of September/October 2007, pp. 277–286. See Lou Basel web site: https://web.archive.org/web/20151002141114/http://hermesheads.home.comcast.net/~hermesheads/
- Michèle Chauvet & Jean-François Brun, Introduction à l'Histoire Postale 1848-1878, Paris 2007.
- Michael Chambers, Messenger of the Gods, Stamp Magazine n° 74–1, January 2008, pp. 44–48.
- Louis Fanchini, Why the so-called "Hulot proofs" do not exist?, Philotelia n° 650 of May/June, 2008, pp. 135–145. See Lou Basel web site: https://web.archive.org/web/20151002141114/http://hermesheads.home.comcast.net/~hermesheads/
- Louis Fanchini, The essays "Cérès 1858": Why are they an integral part of the Greek philately?, Philotelia n° 652/653 & 654 of September/October, November/December 2008 & January/February 2009, pp. 260–270, 364–374 & 7–16. See Lou Basel web site: https://web.archive.org/web/20151002141114/http://hermesheads.home.comcast.net/~hermesheads/ and Chez SébPhilatélie: Hermès, issu de Cérès
- Jean-François Brun, Louis Fanchini, Mario Konialidis & Kyriakos Papathanassiou, The Zante error, Philotelia n° 659 of November/December 2009, n° 662 of May/June 2010, n° 682 of September/October 2014 & n° 685 of March/April 2014, pp. 325–330, 184–186, 269-270 & 68.
- Louis Fanchini, Histoire de grosse tête, Timbres Magazine n° 113 of May 2010, pp. 94 & 95.
- Louis Fanchini, Le premier timbre-poste de Grèce : « la grosse tête d'Hermès », Timbres Magazine n° 114 & 115 of July/August & September 2010, pp. 67–73 & 39–41.
- Bill Ure, Forgeries of Greek stamps of the 19th century, edited by collectio, Athens 2010. (https://www.academiedephilatelie.fr/documentation/ouvrages-parus/forgeries-of-greek-stamps-of-the-19th-century)
- John G. Coundouros, Large Hermes Head - Characteristic marks of all positions in the plate of the values of 5, 10, 20, 40 & 80 lepta, Thessaloniki 2011. (https://www.academiedephilatelie.fr/documentation/bibliotheque/large-hermes-head-characteristic-marks-of-all-positions-in-the-plates-of-the-values-of-5-10-20-40-80-lepta)
- Louis Fanchini, The dies and proofs of large Hermes head, Philotelia n° 669 of July/August 2011, pp. 218–240 (https://pvgriekenland.nl/publications/4_LHH_Dies_Proofs.pdf).
- Stavros Andreadis, Edition d'or XXVIII - The Kassandra collection, Corinphila & Heinrich Köhler, Zurich/Wiesbaden, 2011.
- Constantin Mattheos, Introduction to the large Hermes heads of Greece, 1861-1886, Royal Philatelic Society London, 2011.
- Stephano A. Calliga, The stamps of the large Hermes head - Early Athenian period 1861-1863, Athens 2011.
- Stephano A. Calliga, The stamps of the large Hermes head - 1861-1886 - Overview, Athens 2012.
- Vlastos Hellas I (1861–2011), Vlastos Philatelic centre, Athens 2012.
- John Daes (Γιάννης Νταής) Η από και πρός το εξωτερικό αλληλογραφία, 3 volumes, Athens 2012.
- Hellas Postal Stationery (1876 - 2012) Catalogue - Volume V, edited by Argyris Karamitsos, Thessaloniki 2013.
- Lou Basel, Process for production of the Large Hermes Head progressive proofs, OPUS XIII, 2013, pages 66–68 <Large Hermes Head Stamps>.
- Louis Fanchini, The Ernest Meyer's imprints on the large Hermes head of Greece and on the Cérès of France, OPUS XIII, 2013, pages 69–84. (https://www.aep.eu.com/en/publication/opus-13) & (https://pvgriekenland.nl/publications/3_LHH_Ernest_Meyer.pdf).
- Group of authors, La Grèce, OPUS XIII, Yearly publication of the Académie européenne de philatélie (AEP), Paris, 2013. (https://www.aep.eu.com/fr/opus/opus-xiii)
- Louis Fanchini, Greece's Large Hermes Head, Stamp & Coin Mart of July 2014, pp. 58–60.
- Kyriakos Papathanasssiou, Scholia and Observations on the large Hermes heads of Greece - 1861/1886, Athens 2014.
- Stephano A. Calliga, The 20 Lepta ‘Large Hermes Head’ Stamps of Greece, Athens, 2015.
- Michèle Chauvet, Les Tarifs Helléniques des Lettres Internationales - 1861/1878, Paris, 2015. (https://www.academiedephilatelie.fr/documentation/bibliotheque/les-tarifs-helleniques-des-lettres-internationales-1861-1878)
- John G. Coundouros, The control numbers & the classification of the stamps of the large Hermes head, second édition, Athens 2016.
- Myrsini Vardopoulou, Ελληνικά Γραμματόσημα 1861-1961. Ιστορία-Ιδεολογία-Αισθητική, Athens 2016.
- Louis Fanchini, The recurrent broken "0" Control Numbers error on the 10 lepta of the large Hermes heads, Paris printing, Philotelia no 703 of March/April 2017, pp. 75–78.
- Corinphila, Greece - Postal Rates on Overseas Mail, 1861-1878, auction catalogue, Zurich 2017.
- Louis Fanchini, A new CN error on the 20 lepta of the LHH Consecutive Athens printings, Philotelia no 706 of September/October 2017, pp. 265–266.
- Nikos Karniaoutakis, Large Hermes Heads of Greece - Observations on Identifying and Classifying - The Easier to Follow Value, Mytilene 2019.
- Theofilos Salonidis, The Athens 30 lepta of the 1876-1878 period, Philotelia no 714 of January/February, 2019, pages 6–17, no 715 of March/April, 2019, pages 112–120, no 716 of May/June, 2019, pages 173-180 & no 717 of July/August, 2019, pages 248–254.
- Stephano A. Calliga, Stamps of the Large Hermes Head in 19th Century Greece, Athens 2019 & 2020.
- Louis Fanchini, Définition des termes « EPREUVE » et « ESSAI » et leur application à la « grosse tête d’Hermès », Delcampe Magazine n° 28 of July/August 2019, pages 20–25. (https://blog.delcampe.net/magazine/delcampe-magazine-28.pdf).
- Stephano A. Calliga, 1861 Plates – Reassembly of the 20 Lepta Large Head Stamps of Greece, Athens 2021.
- Michael Kaitatzidis, Large Hermes Heads of Greece - Control numbers errors, Mytilene 2021.
- Stephano A. Calliga, Jewels in the Crown of the Large Hermes Head Plates – 1861, Athens 2021.
- Theofilos Salonidis & Louis Fanchini, Plate flaw on the 30 lepta - White spot on the base of "Λ" of the word "ΛΕΠΤ", Philotelia no 728 of May/June 2021, pp 187–189.
- Stavros Andreadis, Édition d'or Volume 60 - The Kassandra collection - 2nd edition, Corinphila & Heinrich Köhler, Zurich/Wiesbaden, 2021.
- Devlan Kruck, The Synergy of France and Greece, Blog of the Museum of Philately, 2022. (https://blog.museumofphilately.com/the-synergy-of-france-and-greece/)
- Wolfgang Maassen, The Spiros – a Family from Hamburg (Special Issue No. 18 in the series "Chronicle of German Philately"), Schwalmtal, 2022. - https://www.philshop.de/suche/spiro/seite/1/
- John Daes, The Greek postal rates 1828-1875, 2 volumes (A & B), Athens, 2022 & 2024.
- Louis Fanchini, How to take the Italian & French routes for the same journey - Letter from Tunis to Athens (May/June 1872), Le Rekkas no 119 of May 2023, pp 32–33.
- Stavros Andreadis, Large Hermes Heads - Printings and Shades, Thessaloniki 2023. (https://philateliehellenique.wordpress.com/2023/10/22/en-new-color-chart-for-large-hermes-head/)
- Louis Fanchini, Italian & French liners for the same journey - Letter from Tunis to Athens (1872), Philotelia no 740 of May/June, 2023, pages 163–165.
- Louis Fanchini, The highest-known franking to date with Large Hermes Heads - The Ranghavis letter, Philotelia no 741 of July/August, 2023, pages 196–199.
- Dimitris Papitsis, The large Hermes heads of Greece, Seattle, 2024. (https://largehermesheads.com/) and (https://philateliehellenique.wordpress.com/2024/11/10/book-a-new-work-for-the-large-head/) & (https://largehermesheads.com/book-reviews/).
- Hellas Stamp Catalogue & Postal History 2025 - Volume I (1861–1959), edited par Argyris Karamitsos, Thessaloniki 2024.
- Group of members of the Hellenic Philatelic Society of Athens (HPS) for the centenary of the HPS (1925-2025), Traces of Communications, Athènes, 2024. (https://hps.gr/index.php/en/anniversary-edition/) - https://hps.gr/wp-content/uploads/2023/12/HPS_sample_pages.pdf
- Athanasios D. Spanos, ΕΝΑΣ ΔΙΑΦΟΡΕΤΙΚΟΣ ΤΡΟΠΟΣ ΚΑΤΑΤΑΞΗΣ ΤΩΝ ΕΛΛΗΝΙΚΩΝ ΓΡΑΜΜΑΤΟΣΗΜΩΝ ΤΗΣ ΜΕΓΑΛΗΣ ΚΕΦΑΛΗΣ ΤΟΥ ΕΡΜΗ - ΑΛΓΟΡΙΘΜΟΙ - ΔΙΑΓΡΑΜΜΑΤΑ ΡΟΗΣ, Athens, 2024.
- Louis Fanchini, The European Biannual Highlight: The highest known franking, as of today, with Large Hermes Heads - "The Ranghavis letter", Trait d'Union/AEP of the 1st semester 2024, pages 18-21.
- Louis Fanchini, Biography of Désiré-Albert Barre on the web site of the Philatelic Postal Museum of Athens, 2025 (https://ft-museum.gr/en/2024/01/12/desire-albert-barre-2/).
- Louis Fanchini, Édition d'or Volume 89 - The Fabrication and the Postal Usage of the Large Hermes Head of Greece (1861-1901), Corinphila & Heinrich Köhler, Zurich/Wiesbaden, 2026.
- Many articles from various authors, published from 1924 up to now on Philotelia, the bimonthly bulletin of the Hellenic Philotelic Society (HPS) of Athens, Greece (https://hps.gr/index.php/en/classic/).

== External links (Large Hermes Heads) ==
General Philately:

- Académie de Philatélie (In French).
- Académie Européenne de Philatélie - AEP (In English & in Greek).
- Club Philatélique et Cartophile de Truchtersheim - CPCT (In French & in German).
- Federation of European Philatelic Associations - FEPA.
- Fédération Française des Associations Philatéliques - FFAP (In French).
- Fédération Internationale de Philatélie - FIP.
- Hellenic Philatelic Federation site (ΕΦΟ) (In English & in Greek).
- Hellenic Philatelic Society of Athens - HPS (In English & in Greek).
- Hellenic Philatelic Society of the Netherlands - HPS-NL (In English & in Dutch).
- Philatélie Hellénique - Par passion pour la Grèce (In French & in English).
- Philatelic Postal Museum of Athens (In English & in Greek).
- Royal Philatelic Society of London - RPSL.
- The Collectors Club of New York - CCNY.

General Philately - Literature:

- Association Internationale des Journalistes - AIJP (In English and in German).

Large Hermes Head - Traditional Philately:

- Louis Basel, Hermes Heads, LHH specialised site.
- Conference summary: Le tirage de Paris de la « grosse tête d'Hermès » - Académie de Philatélie (2009, In French).
- Presentation summary on pièces: Erreurs d'impression des « chiffres de contrôle » de la « grosse tête d'Hermès » - Académie de Philatélie (2009, In French).
- Presentation summary on pièces: Le poinçon original du médaillon de la « grosse tête d'Hermès » - Académie de Philatélie (2009, In French).
- Presentation summary on pièces: Galvano du 30 lepta (1875-1876) de la « grosse tête d'Hermès » - Académie de Philatélie (2010, In French).
- Conference summary: Le timbre de la « grosse tête d'Hermès » de Grèce - Académie de Philatélie (2010, In French).
- Conference: La « grosse tête d'Hermès » à l'Association Philatélique Sparnacienne - APS (2011, In French) - CPCT site.
- Study: The Dies and Proofs of the “Large Hermes Head” of Greece - Hellenic Philatelic Society of the Netherlands (2011).
- Conference summary: « Chiffres de contrôle » des timbres de la « grosse tête d'Hermès » de Grèce - Académie de Philatélie (2013, In French).
- Conference summary: Les poinçons, épreuves et essais de la « grosse tête d'Hermès » de Grèce - Académie de Philatélie (2013, In French).
- Study: The Ernest Meyer's imprints on the "large Hermes heads" of Greece and on the "Cérès" of France - Hellenic Philatelic Society of the Netherlands site (2013).
- Conference summary: La fabrication de la « grosse tête d’Hermès » de Grèce - Académie de Philatélie (2015, In French).
- Conference: La fabrication de la « grosse tête d’Hermès » de Grèce - Académie de Philatélie (2015, In French) - CPCT site.
- Video of the conference: The "large Hermes head" dies, plates, die-proofs and plate-proofs - The Collectors Club, New York, USA (2016).
- Conference: The "large Hermes Head" dies, plates, die-proofs and plate-proofs - The Collectors Club, New York, USA (2016).
- Conference: Comment démarrer une collection de la « grosse tête d'Hermès » de Grèce - Académie de Philatélie (2018, In French) - CPCT site.
- Video of the conference (1/2): Comment démarrer une collection de la "grosse tête d'Hermès" de Grèce - Hellenic Philotelic Society of Athens - HPS (2019) - Philatélie Hellènique site
- Video of the conference (2/2): The fabrication of the "large Hermes head" (dies, plates, die-proofs & plate-proofs) - Hellenic Philotelic Society of Athens - HPS (2019) - Philatélie Hellènique site
- Philotelistes Philatelic forum for Greek classical period and all Greek stamps issues, including postal history. Greek and foreign countries philatelic bibliography as well (In Greek).
- Exhibit: "GREECE: Fabrication & Postal Usage of the Large Hermes Heads Paris printings" - Museum of Philately by David Feldman International Auctioneers (2021).
- Exhibit: "GREECE: Fabrication & Postal Usage of the Large Hermes Heads (1861-1901)" - Museum of Philately by David Feldman International Auctioneers (2021).
- Exhibit: "GREECE: The Fakes & Forgeries of the Large Hermes Heads" - Museum of Philately by David Feldman International Auctioneers (2021).
- Article: "The Synergy of France and Greece" - Museum of Philately by David Feldman International Auctioneers (2022).
- Résumé d'une conférence : La grosse tête d'Hermès (1861-1901) à l'Académie de Philatélie (2023, In French).
- Conference : La grosse tête d’Hermès de Grèce (1861/1901) à l'Académie de Philatélie (2023, In French) - Site Hellenic Philatelic Federation - ΕΦΟ .
- Presentation of the book of Dimitris Papitsis: The Large Hermes Heads of Greece, Thessaloniki, 2024.
- Exposition : "GREECE: Fabrication & Postal Usage of the Large Hermes Heads (1861-1901)" - Site Hellenic Philatelic Federation - (ΕΦΟ) (2026).

Large Hermes Head - Postal History:

- Conference summary: Un peu d'histoire postale la « grosse tête d'Hermès » de Grèce - Académie de Philatélie (2011, In French).
- Conference summary: Au pied de la lettre - Académie de Philatélie (2011, In French).
- Conference summary: Dilemmes philatéliques - Académie de Philatélie (2012, In French).
- Conference summary: Les affranchissements partiels et la Grèce 1861-1875 - Académie de Philatélie (2015, In French).
- Presentation summary on pieces: Deux lettres « taxées » remarquables avec des « grosses têtes d’Hermès » de Grèce à l'Académie de Philatélie (2018, In French).
- Presentation summary on piece: Quatre bateaux pour trois bajocchi à l'Académie de Philatélie (2019, In French).
- Presentation summary on piece: Lettre d’Athènes pour Lyon du 2e semestre 1875 (2020, In French).
- Exhibit: "GREECE: Fabrication & Postal Usage of the Large Hermes Heads Paris printings" - Museum of Philately by David Feldman International Auctioneers (2021).
- Exhibit : "GREECE: Fabrication & Postal Usage of the Large Hermes Heads (1861-1901)" - Museum of Philately by David Feldman International Auctioneers (2021).
- Conference summary: Le plus grand affranchissement connu à ce jour, avec des grosses têtes d'Hermès de Grèce "La lettre de Ranghavis" - Académie de Philatélie (2023, In French).
- Conference summary: La grosse tête d'Hermès (1861-1901) à l'Académie de Philatélie (2023, In French).
- Conference : La grosse tête d’Hermès de Grèce (1861/1901) à l'Académie de Philatélie (2023, In French) - Site Hellenic Philatelic Federation - ΕΦΟ .
- Exposition : "GREECE: Fabrication & Postal Usage of the Large Hermes Heads (1861-1901)" - Site Hellenic Philatelic Federation - (ΕΦΟ) (2026).
