= Cinderella Stamp Club =

People's club dedicated to philately in London, England

The Cinderella Stamp Club was founded on 5 June 1959 in London, England, and is an association of philatelists, amateur and professional, whose interests lie in local stamps, telegraph stamps, railway stamps, revenue stamps, fiscals, forgeries, bogus and phantom issues, Christmas, Red Cross, TB and other charity seals, registration labels, advertisement and poster stamps and many other items - all of which are the so-called "Cinderellas of Philately". It includes the study of the stamp retailers who played so much of a part in the hobby.

== Activities ==
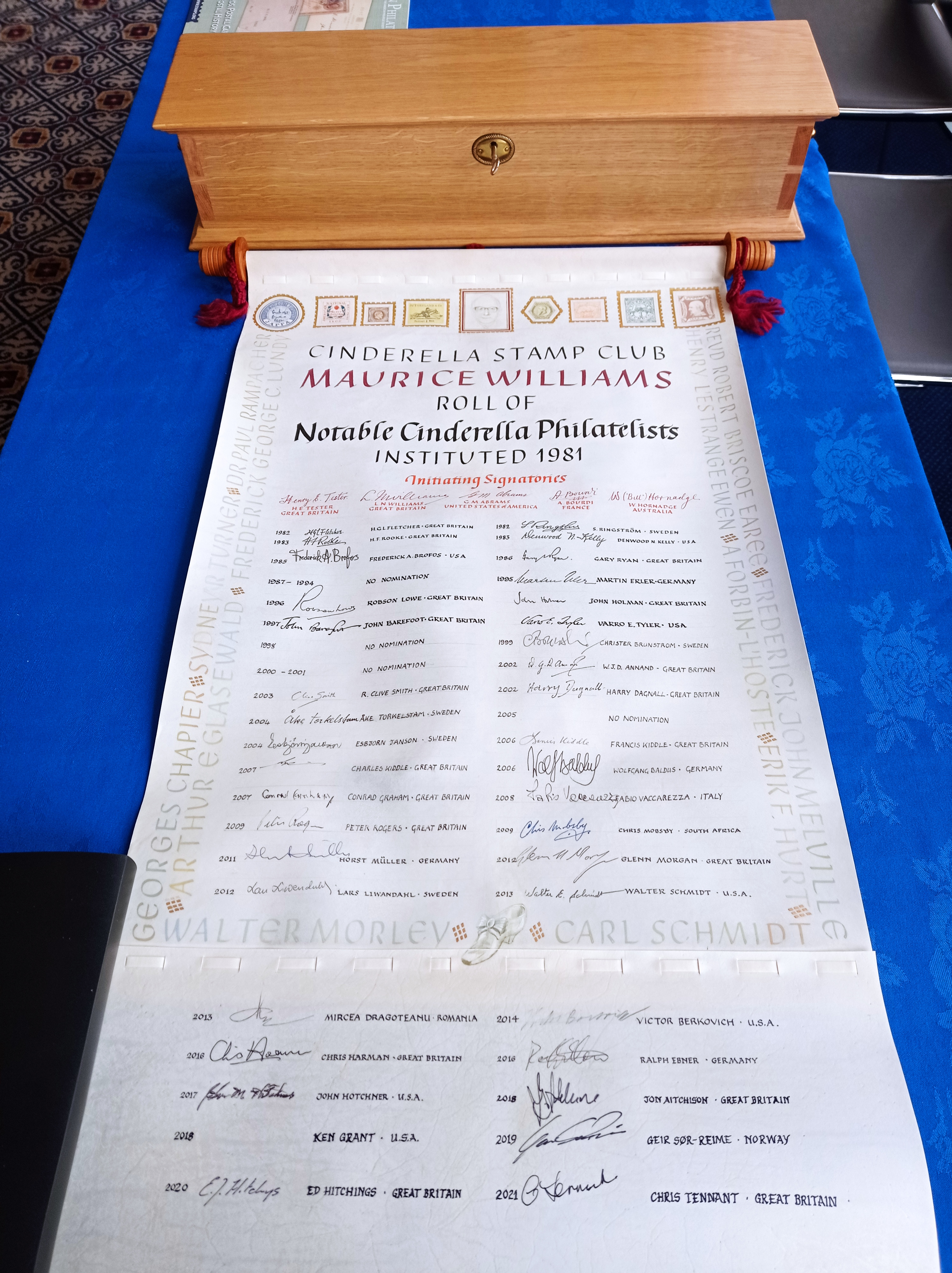
Cinderella Stamp Club Maurice Williams Roll of Notable Cinderella Philatelists pictured in June 2022.

The club publishes a quarterly journal, The Cinderella Philatelist and at the end of 2008 had a membership of nearly 500, of which over 150 were outside the UK. The club has begun to publish its auction catalogues within its quarterly journals for the ease of mailing it out to overseas members.

The major stamp catalogues do not usually list cinderella stamps, except in the back of the book and the club has published many works of reference, often written by members, on areas where little else has been written. The diverse subjects have included the philately of the British Empire Exhibition and the Red Cross Vignettes of Gaston Fontanille, or Delandre as he preferred to be called.

The Club operates four study groups: British Private Posts, World War 1, World War 2 and Telegraph & Telephone. Each group publishes a quarterly newsletter which is incorporated into The Cinderella Philatelist.

Notable members include the brothers Charles and Francis Kiddle.

Auctioneer and attendees of the Cinderella Stamp Club auction, RPSL London, 10 October 2026.

== Affiliations ==
The Club is a member of the Association of British Philatelic Societies and is affiliate number 91 of the American Philatelic Society.

== Publications ==
=== Handbooks by number ===
1. The Literature on Cinderella Philately by H.E. Tester, 1972.
2. The Finnish Shipping Companies and their Stamps by G.W. Connell, 1972.
3. Forgeries of China's "large dragons" 1878 by James Negus, 1978.
4. United Kingdom Savings Stamps, Labels and Coupons: A survey of small savings available to the working classes of Great Britain and Northern Ireland including a detailed listing of labels, coupons and stamps issued on a national basis by Lionel D. Jones, 1979.
5. Collecting Seals and Labels by Charles D. Rabinovitz, 1982.
6. Index to The Cinderella Philatelist 1961-1985 and to The Private Post 1977-1985 by Ian D. Crane, 1986. ISBN 0-9503811-2-8
7. Great Britain: The stamps of the circular delivery companies and their forgeries by Christopher G. Harman, 1990.
8. Great Britain Commemorative Labels pre 1950 - A Catalogue by Chris Chatfield, 1991. ISBN 0-9503811-3-6
9. Christmas Charity Posts - The first decade: 1981-1990 by W.J.D. Annand, 1993. ISBN 1-85829-019-8
10. Great Britain. British Empire Exhibition Wembley 1924-1925 Publicity Labels by Alan D. Sabey, 1994. ISBN 1-85829-040-6 (Supplement 1996 ISBN 1-85829-043-0)
11. Images of the Great War Volume III, an illustrated catalogue of Delandre’s Red Cross Vignettes 1914-1917 by Walter Schmidt & Charles Kiddle. ISBN 0-9524655-0-7
12. Publications by Editions Delandre by Charles Kiddle.
13. Images of the Great War Volume IV, an illustrated catalogue of Delandre’s Vignettes other than Military and Red Cross 1914-1917 by Walter Schmidt & Charles Kiddle.
14. Index to the Cinderella Philatelist from 1986 to 2000 (Volumes 26-40) by Michael James.

=== Others ===
- The Bulletin of the Fiscal Philatelic Society Vols 1-11, 1908-1928 (Reprint 1980)
- Cumulative Index to The Bulletin of the Fiscal Philatelic Society; Volumes 1-2; 1908-1928 Cinderella Stamp Club, 1982.

== See also ==
- Christmas Seal & Charity Stamp Society
- Cinderella stamp
