= Easter Seals =

Easter Seals can refer to:

- Easterseals (U.S.) – formerly "Easter Seals", an international charitable organization devoted to providing opportunities for children and adults with physical disabilities.
- Easter Seals (Canada) – a Canadian organization inspired by the United States–based organization
- Easter seals (philately) – stamps issued by the above organizations

== See also ==
- Christmas Seal stamps benefiting the American Lung Association
