= Jean Barre =

Jean Barre may refer to:

- Jean Alexandre Barré (1880–1967), French neurologist
- Jean-Auguste Barre (1811–1896), French sculptor and medalist
- Jean-Baptiste Barré (1763–1830), French naval officer
- Jean-Benoît-Vincent Barré (1732–1824), French architect
- Jean Barre (canoeist) (born 1945), Canadian sprint canoer

== See also ==
- Barre (surname)
- Jacques-Jean Barre (1793–1855), French engraver
