= Harbour Haunt =

Fundraiser in support of Easter Seals

Zombie Train
- Formerly: Harbour Haunt (2002-2013)
- Headquarters: St. John's, Newfoundland and Labrador, Canada
- Owner: Frontline Action
- Website: zombietrain.ca

Harbour Haunt was a yearly fundraiser in support of Easter Seals Newfoundland and Labrador brought to the non-profit by Revenue Development Director, Colleen Hann, in St. John's. In Corner Brook, Newfoundland, there is another Harbour Haunt where Easter Seals partners with the Humber Community YMCA and the Community Youth Network. There have been two thus far and a third haunted maze is in the works. Harbour Haunt is known as the largest haunted attraction east of Toronto and the only one of its kind in Atlantic Canada. Harbour Haunt has been held for nine years now and 100% of proceeds made from the month-long fundraiser benefits the Easter Seals. In 2013, the event was not held due to financial difficulties and waning popularity. However, in 2014, the event was revived by Frontline Action, a paintball and laser tag firm, and was given a new name, Terror Town. This "new" Harbour Haunt experience operates as a for-profit, with a portion of each admission being donated to Easter Seals and the Miles for Smiles foundation; this event managed to raise $3000 for both charities.
