= Ceres series (France) =

First series of postage stamps in France

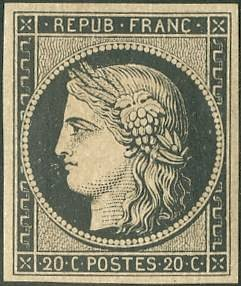
20 centimes black, one of the first two issued stamps of the series.

The Ceres series was the first postage stamp series of France, issued in 6 different values from 1849 to 1850 as a representation of the French Republic.

The series bore the effigy of Ceres, goddess of growing plants in Roman mythology. Jacques-Jean Barre did the initial drawing and gravure. Anatole Hulot was in charge of the printing of the Ceres series done in Paris in the 19th century.

The drawing was used again by necessity when the Second Empire fell in 1870, with printing in Paris besieged by German armies and in Bordeaux where the French government fled. Two new Ceres series were issued in the 1930s and 1940s.

As first series of France, these stamps appeared regularly on commemorative stamps for philatelic anniversaries and exhibitions, and on the logo of many philatelic organizations and firms.

== Stamps of France ==
=== Second Republic, 1849-1851 ===
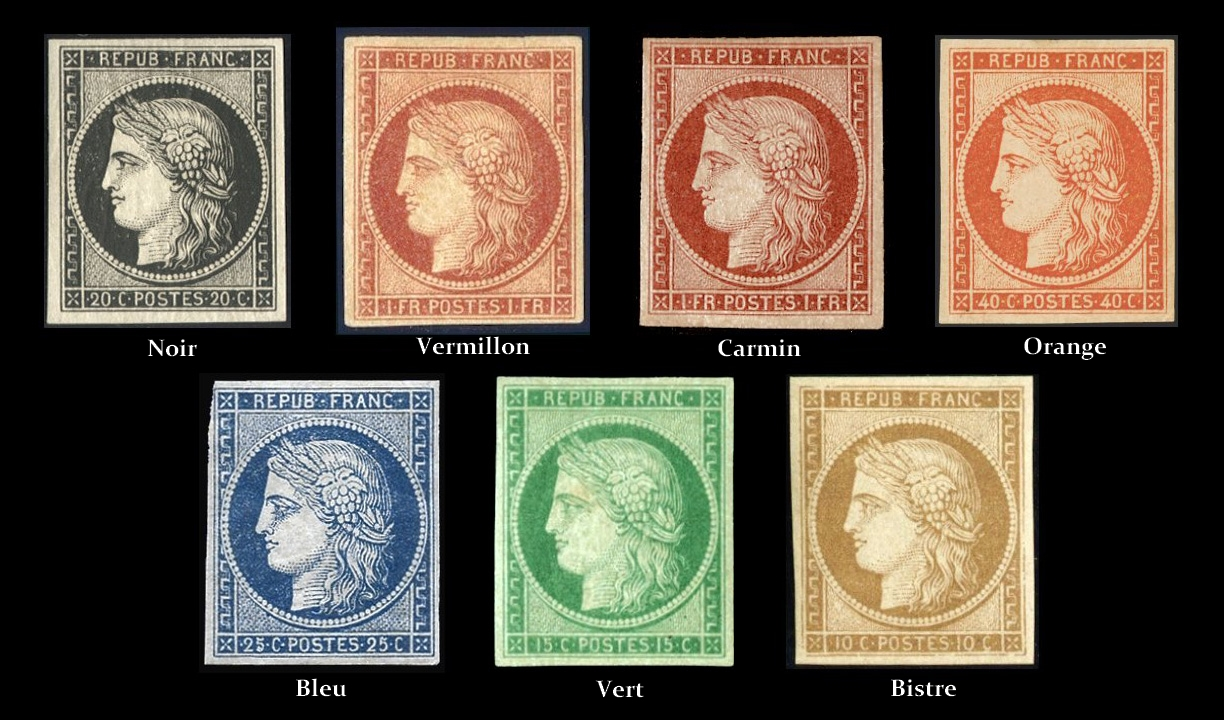
The two first Ceres series, 1849-1852, Second French Republic

The two first postal stamps issued in France were of the Ceres series. They were printed with the effigy of Ceres, goddess of growing plants in Roman mythology. She wore a garland of wheat and a bunch of grapes in her hair. The design, which avoided any specifically republican or Revolutionary connotations, was drawn by Jacques-Jean Barre, general engraver at the Paris Mint, under the supervision of Anatole Hulot, a civil servant who obtained the right to print the stamps at the Mint until 1876.

The issue on the first January 1849 marked the application of a postal reform similar to the one in the United Kingdom of May 1840: to simplify the nationwide postal rates between Metropolitan France, Corsica and French Algeria and to encourage the payment by the sender through the use of postage stamps.

In January 1849, the two first denominations were a 20 centimes black stamp and a 1 franc red. As the postal reform was extended to other rates (local, rural and newspapers), new denominations were issued.

As early as 1849, the first of these stamps that earned philatelic interests afterwards existed. Because the black cancellations can be masked and the 20 centimes black stamp easily reused, the issue of the 40 centimes blue in January was aborted and switched to orange. While the 20 centimes blue was first printed in Spring 1849, it never replaced its black counterpart because of a change of rates in July 1850. In December 1849, part of the much paler red of the 1 franc stamps were recalled by the postal administration because their tint was too close to the 40 centimes orange to be issued in February 1850. The lighter stamps were named "vermilion" by philatelists. Two half-stamps of each tint were stuck on the official order to retrieve the vermilion.

After the coup in December 1851, Prince-President Louis-Napoléon Bonaparte decided to have his effigy on French stamps. The first denominations were issued progressively from September 1852 and throughout the Second Empire.

A poor imitation of the French stamps was used by the Corrientes Province local post in Argentina between 1856 and 1880.

=== Franco-Prussian War, 1870-1871 ===
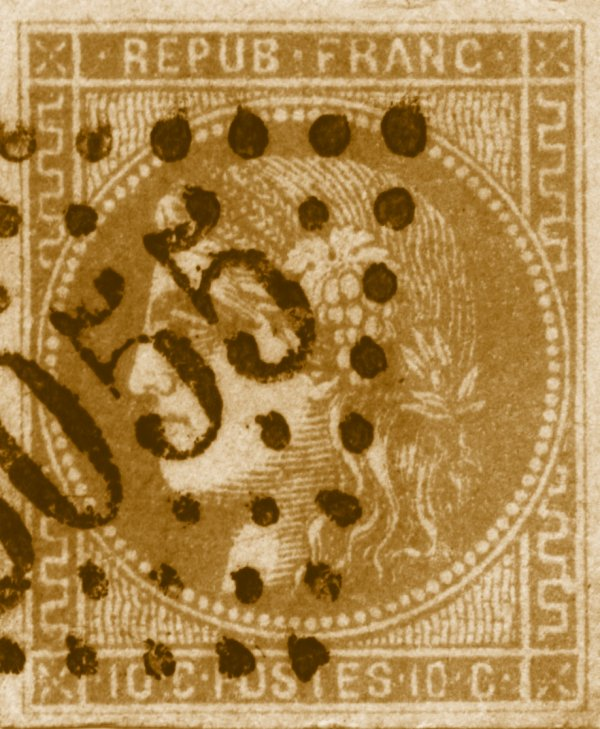
A stamp from the Bordeaux issue.

During the Franco-Prussian War, after Republicans abolished the Empire of Napoléon III on 4 September 1870, they faced the siege of Paris by the German armies and the lack of postage stamps from the former rule. Houlot had to print new Ceres stamps until the insurrection of the Paris Commune, in Spring 1871. The printer told afterwards he hid the Ceres series material and was forced by the insurgents to print Napoleon III stamps.

At the same time, in Bordeaux, where the provisional government fled, the printing of Ceres stamps was authorized from the 5 November 1870 to the 4 March 1871 to supply the post offices of non-occupied France. The stamps were printed in lithography (instead of typography) by Augée-Delile. Because of this choice, stamps differ repetitively from one another.

=== Third Republic ===
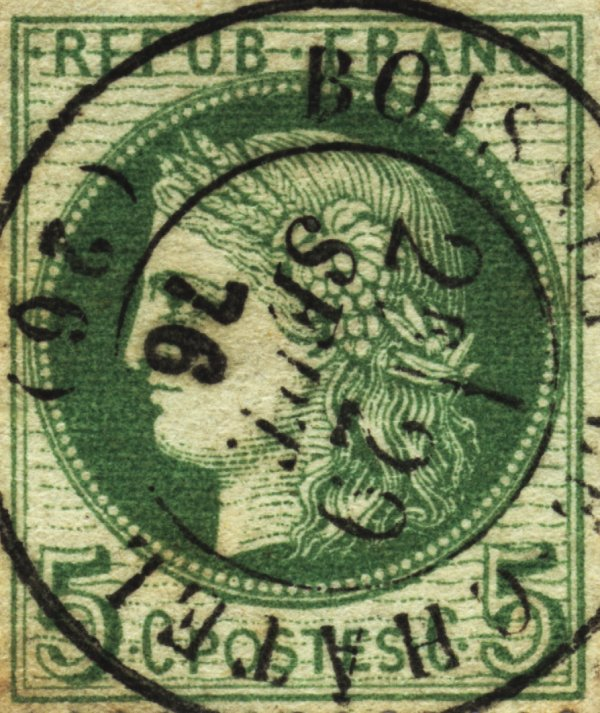
Ceres stamp issued during the Third Republic.

After the war, the Ceres head was kept until 1875, again printed only in Paris by Anatole Hulot. He had to use old material to create new denominations (like the low values created in Bordeaux) because Désiré-Albert Barre, Jacques-Jean's son, broke his association with Hulot in 1866.

In July 1875, the postal administration gave the printing of its postage stamps to the Banque de France to reduce the high cost and delays it accused Hulot. The stamp design was changed too: a competition launched in August 1875 was won by Jules Auguste Sage with its Commerce and Peace uniting and reigning over the world allegory. The new stamps were issued in 1876.

=== 1937-1941 ===
For the philatelic exhibition of Paris in 1937, PEXIP, a minisheet of four bicolored Ceres stamps was issued.

The next year, in 1938, began a new Ceres series with high values (1.75 to 3 francs), alongside the Sower series and the Peace series. The head was kept into a new decorum. All these definitives were retired in 1941 and replaced by Philippe Pétain's effigies, the Iris and Mercury series.

=== Liberation, 1945-1947 ===
In 1945, a redesign effigy of Ceres by Charles Mazelin was among the numerous definitive series to be issue in liberated France.

=== Since 1949, on commemorative stamps ===
The Jacques-Jean Barre's Ceres effigy had appeared again on stamps commemorating the philatelic and postal history of France:

- 1948: Stamp's Day stamps on stamps with effigy of Étienne Arago, director of posts in 1849;
- 1949: a vertical stripe of two Ceres stamps and two Mariannes by Gandon (the definitive series of the time) for the centenary of the first French postage stamp;
- 1949: inside a large white minisheet, was printed in intaglio a vermilion 10 franc Ceres stamp for the CIPEX exhibition in Paris;
- 1999: for the 150th anniversary, a booklet of five black Ceres and one red Ceres stamps on stamps;
- 1999: at the occasion of Philexfrance '99 in Paris, a stamp on stamp with the 20 centimes black and a holographic Ceres head.

The logo of the philatelic service of La Poste used the Ceres head.

== In the French colonies ==
From 1849 to 1924, French Algeria used the same postage stamps and postal rates as in Metropolitan France. The Ceres series from France could be found cancelled in the French colony.

In 1850 and 1851, a little number of colonies used the Second Republic Ceres stamps.

From 1871 to 1877, imperforated Ceres stamps were sent to the colonies to replace the imperforate Napoléon III stamps. They served until the issue of the imperforate Sage stamps in 1876. A way to recognize the colonial Ceres stamps is the cancellation with a three letter code for each colony.

== Sources and references ==
- Collective (2000). Timbres de France. Le spécialisé. 1849–1900, Yvert et Tellier, tome 1, volume 1, 3rd reviewed and corrected edition.
