= Albert Désiré Barre =

French sculptor

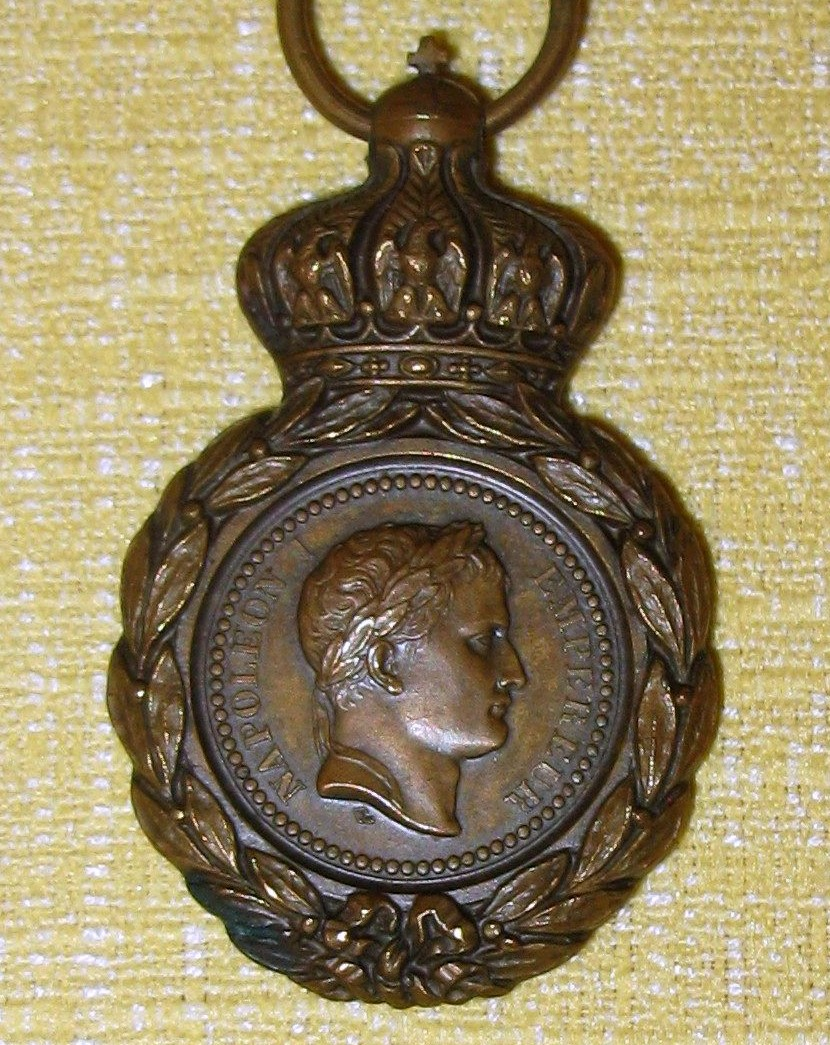
Médaille de Sainte-Hélène designed by Barre

Albert Désiré Barre (Paris 6 May 1818 – 29 December 1878) was a French engraver, medalist, and the 18th Chief Engraver of the Paris Mint from 27 February 1855 to his death. He was the son of Jacques-Jean Barre who preceded him as the Chief Engraver. His brother Jean-Auguste Barre, a French sculptor and medalist, succeeded him as Chief Engraver after his death in Paris.

== Early life ==
Attracted to painting, Barre joined the École nationale supérieure des Beaux-Arts in 1838 and became a pupil of Paul Delaroche. His interest in ancient art led him to take several trips to Italy. He exhibited biblical themes at the Paris Salon from 1843 to 1851. He received a third-class medal at the Salon in 1846. He painted the frescoes in the chapel of Saint-Eustache, Paris. Having failed to finish the frescoes he had begun in the chapel of the Holy Innocents in the same church, they were by the Paul-Dominique Gourlier in 1855.

His career changed when his father, Jacques-Jean Barre, asked him to assist him at the mint in 1845. Became his father's closest collaborator, so much so that it becomes difficult to distinguish their respective contributions, especially for the early French stamp projects dating from 1848.

== Chief Engraver ==
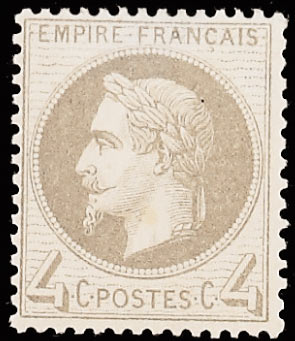
Napoleon III stamp designed by Barre

In February 1855, he succeeded his father, to the post of Chief Engraver of the Paris Mint. He wrote Graveurs Généraux et particuliers des Monnaies de France, Contrôleurs Généraux des Effigies, Noms de quelques graveurs en Médailles de la Renaissance Française, published in 1867.

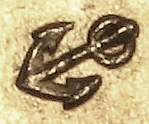
Désiré-Albert Barre anchor mint mark used on french coins between 1855 and 1878

In 1855, he resumed the work of his father, including engravings for French postage stamps. Barre, unlike his father, did not work well with Anatole Hulot the contractor responsible for printing the stamps. Hulot was an expert at electroplating, and utilized that technique to make the printing plates for the stamps. To compete with this technique for the reproduction of images on the printing plates, Barre embarked on striking tests with coining presses between 1858 and 1859. He produced, on the order of the Committee on Coins, test types of the Ceres stamp. In the end, Hulot retained the contract by lowering his prices. In 1861, thanks to the delay of Hulot, the technique of using the coin press, however, allowed Barre to take the contract to produce printing plates of the first postage stamps of Greece. Barre had designed the drawing and the dies for the new Hermes type, a few months prior. In 1876, he provided the same work for the creation of two additional stamps.

The strained relationship between Barre and Hulot caused delays in the production of new stamps in the early 1860s. In disagreement with Hulot's work, Barre delayed the delivery of the dies of the new laurel effigies of Napoleon III stamps which had been designed in early 1861. On two occasions for the new denomination, Hulot returned the die damaged to Barre for retouching. In August 1866, although he has made the model in July, Barre refused to engrave the die of the new five francs stamp. Hulot has to make do with copies of old dies.

After his death, his brother Jean-Auguste Barre succeeded him as Chief Engraver in 1879.
