= Postage stamps and postal history of France =

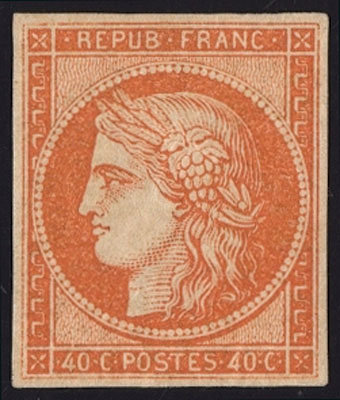
An 1849 stamp of France

This is a survey of the postage stamps and postal history of France.

== First stamps ==
=== Second Republic ===
The first stamps of France were issued on 1 January 1849. They were designed by Jacques-Jean Barre. The medallion depicts the head of goddess Ceres facing left.

In 1852 a new series of definitive stamps were issued, retaining the inscription "REPUB FRANC" but replacing Ceres with the head of Louis-Napoléon Bonaparte.

=== Second Empire ===
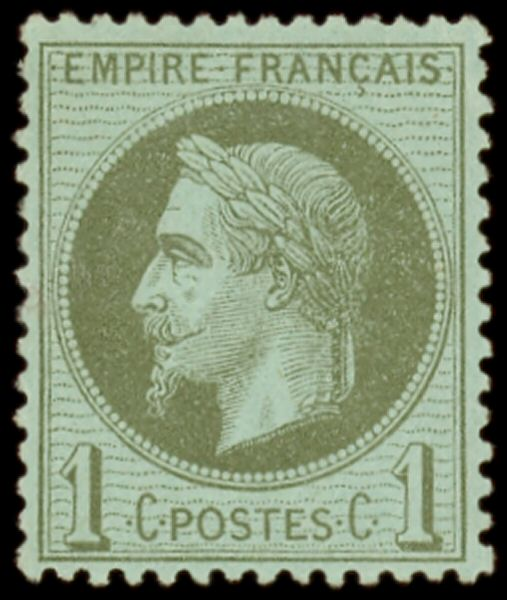
Napoleon III stamp

In 1853, after proclamation of the 2nd Empire, the inscription was changed to "EMPIRE FRANC", while retaining the head of Napoleon III in the medallion.

Starting in 1862, a new type of definitive stamp was introduced. It depicts the head of Napoleon III with a laurel wreath and the inscription changed to "EMPIRE-FRANÇAIS".

The Napoleon stamps remained in use until the fall of the 2nd Empire in 1870.

=== Third Republic ===
The Ceres series stamps, in a slightly different design and printed in lithography, were reintroduced in 1870 and remained in use until 1876. In 1876 a new design of definitive stamps was introduced. It was designed by Jules Auguste Sage and displayed an allegory of Commerce and Peace.

== See also ==
- Ceres series (France)
- French post offices abroad
- Peace and Commerce issue
- Navigation and Commerce issue
- Postage stamps of the French colonies
