= Mouchon =

Mouchon is a surname. Notable people with the surname include:

- Louis-Eugène Mouchon (1843–1914), French painter.
- Pierre Mouchon (1733–1797), eighteenth-century Swiss pastor.
