= Delandre =

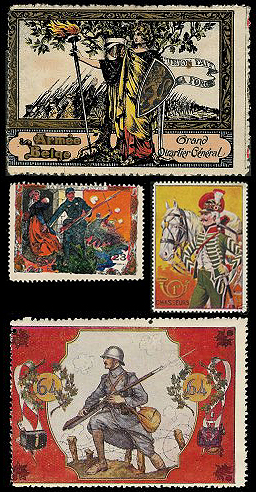
Some Delandre vignettes.

Gaston Aime Camille Fontanille (born 11 May 1883), also known just as Delandre, was a French entrepreneur and conman born in Valence, the son of a magistrate.

== The Delandre Vignettes ==
One of Delandre's many schemes was the invention of the Delandre vignette which was a popular form of label or poster stamp during World War I. He started by reproducing Italian regimental vignettes when the supply of originals proved insufficient for his needs. From there he expanded to include French army stamps and ultimately he produced over 4000 different patriotic stamps which have become a popular collecting area in cinderella philately. Delandre responded to claims of forgery of the Italian vignettes by claiming that they were 're-impressions'. He explained in a 1916 letter that he sold three types, real ones, re-impressions and new stamps that he created himself. He also stated that he had produced successful facsimiles. Detailed catalogues of Delandre's oeuvre have been produced by Charles Kiddle and Walter Schmidt.

== Arrest and death ==
Following the success of Delandre's other productions, the French Red Cross asked him to produce similar stamps for them in order to raise funds. Unfortunately, despite selling many stamps, Delandre failed to pay the Red Cross their share of the proceeds and in 1917 he was arrested.

By 1925 he was on the run after perpetrating yet another fraud involving silver foxes. He ended up in Marseille and under the guise of Baron Edmond Picarat he began another fraud by starting a leprosy charity. On the verge of being discovered, he committed suicide by taking poison on 10 March 1927. He was buried as Edmond Picarat until his true identity was discovered some months later.

== Other activities ==
Delandre was arrested many times for various other schemes including the creation of a chemical company to which he appointed several prominent businessmen as directors without their knowledge, and the sale of noble titles of dubious status.

Other pseudonyms used by Gaston Fontanille include Commander Deville, The Baron Allard, The Marquis of Vaurens and The Count of Chabanes.
