= Anatole Hulot =

French civil servant (1811–1891)

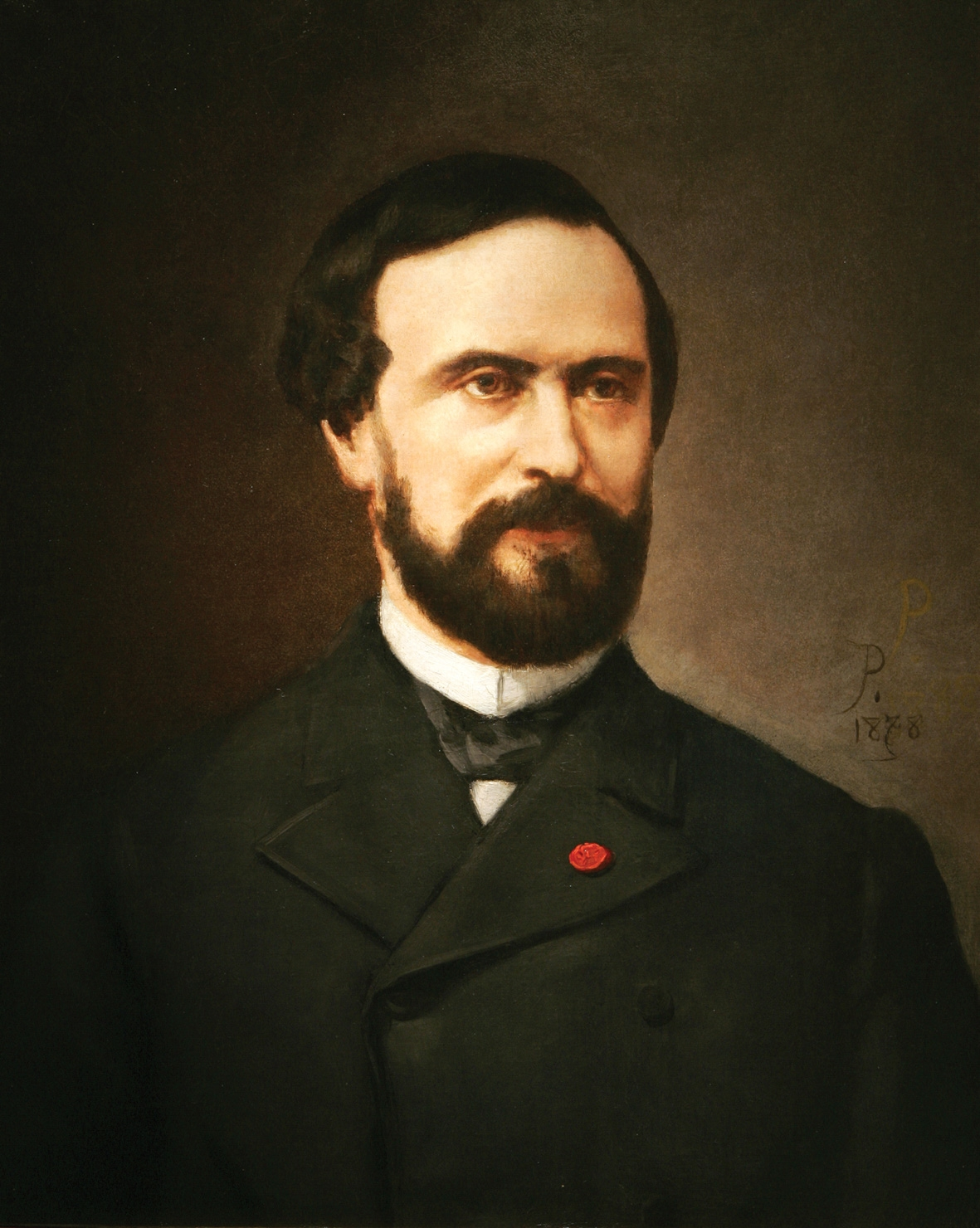
- Born: 2 March 1811
- Died: 22 December 1891 (aged 80)
- Occupation: Civil Servant

Anatole Auguste Hulot (English: /uːloʊ/ yoo-LOH, French: [anatɔl oɡyst ylo]; born 1811 in Le Mans – 22 December 1891) was a French civil servant who directed the designing and printing of the first postage stamps of France between 1848 and 1876.

== Life and work ==
Anatole Hulot worked at the prefecture of Paris. He helped the Banque de France to make a banknote because he mastered electroplating. This method permitted to quickly create printing plates from the first print of an engraving.

He attended meetings in the same Masonic Lodge as Jacques-Jean Barre, general engraver of the Paris Mint. Barre helped him enter this institution as adjoint to the general engraver, title he obtained in June 1848.

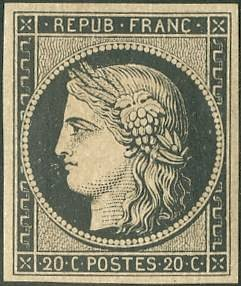
First French stamp designed by Antole Hulot

In 1848, he was chosen to make the first postage stamps of France, to be issued on 1 January 1849. From 1848 to 1851, the entrepreneur Hulot worked in a régie: the French postal administration was responsible for the financial risks and paid for all necessary expenses which Hulot must prove (Barre's drawings and engravings, manufacturing of the printing material, the printer and his workers, paper, ink and gum). A decree transformed the régie into a firm on 7 April 1851. Hulot was then the owner responsible for all risks and benefits, but the galvanos and matrix remain State property. He was paid 1.50 franc for each thousand stamps ordered and delivered to the postal administration.

In 1861, he received the title of Director of the manufacturing of postage stamps. Between 1848 and 1876, inside a building of the paris Mint, he directed the production of Ceres stamps (except the 1870 Bordeaux issue), the different designs of the Napoleon III effigy on stamps and the colonial Eagle series. He was surveyed by the Commission of the Mint and Medals.

However, during his direction, Hulot's relations with the postal administration had wavered many times. Reluctant as soon as December 1855 to perforate stamps like the British Post Office began, Hulot was forced to adopt it at the end of 1861, with stamp issue in 1862. Worse, after Jacques-Jean Barre died in 1855, he didn't succeed to work with his son and new general engraver, Désiré-Albert and they end their association in August 1866. But their conflict continued next Autumn until the Commission of Mint and Medals decided that Barre son had to re-engrave a laurel-crowned Napoleon III hallmark. Hulot created new stamps including the 5 franc stamp, the first large postage stamp of France, by putting together older material from Barre father and son until the 1870s.

During the Siege of Paris by German armies in 1870, Houlot printed again Ceres stamps on order of the new republican government. During the Commune in Spring 1871, he told he hid the Ceres series printing material, so that insurgents printed Napoleon III stamps, retrieved in May 1871.

During the civil peace, Hulot perfectionated the printing method: instead of a one-piece galvano of 150 stamps, he manufactured individual stamp plates that could be easily and less costly replaced when broken.

Finally, the postal administration got impatient with the usual delays of Hulot (perforation, the laurelled effigy decided in 1861 and first stamp issued in December 1862) and questioned the cost even if Hulot's prices had been reduced over the years. In 1875, he was paid 0.60 franc for one thousand stamps for the first 500 first millions, then 50 centimes a thousand. The Banque de France's printing plant in Hauteville street won the contract beginning on 31 December 1875 with a price of 47 centimes for a thousand stamps. Yet, Hulot worked until 30 June 1876 thank to a delay in the first printings of the new Sage stamp design.

He was authorized to continue living in his apartment inside the Paris Mint hotel.

== Sources and references ==
- Pascal Behr, Jean-François Brun et Michèle Chauvet (2000). Timbres de France. Le Spécialisé, volume 1, Yvert et Tellier, Amiens, ISBN 2-86814-097-1.
- Directing by Jean-François Brun (1998). Le Patrimoine du timbre-poste français, Flohic editions, ISBN 2-84234-035-3.
- Collective (2005). Chronique du timbre-poste français, Chroniques and La Poste, ISBN 2-205-05738-3.
