= Hulot =

Hulot (French: [y'lo]) may refer to:

== People ==
- Anatole Hulot (1811–1891), French civil servant
- Nicolas Hulot (born 1955), French ecologist

== Places ==
- Hulot Peninsula, Antarctica

== Other ==
- Monsieur Hulot, title character in Les Vacances de Monsieur Hulot by Jacques Tati

== See also ==
- Jean-Marie Hullot (1954-2019), French computer scientist
