= Vignette (philately) =

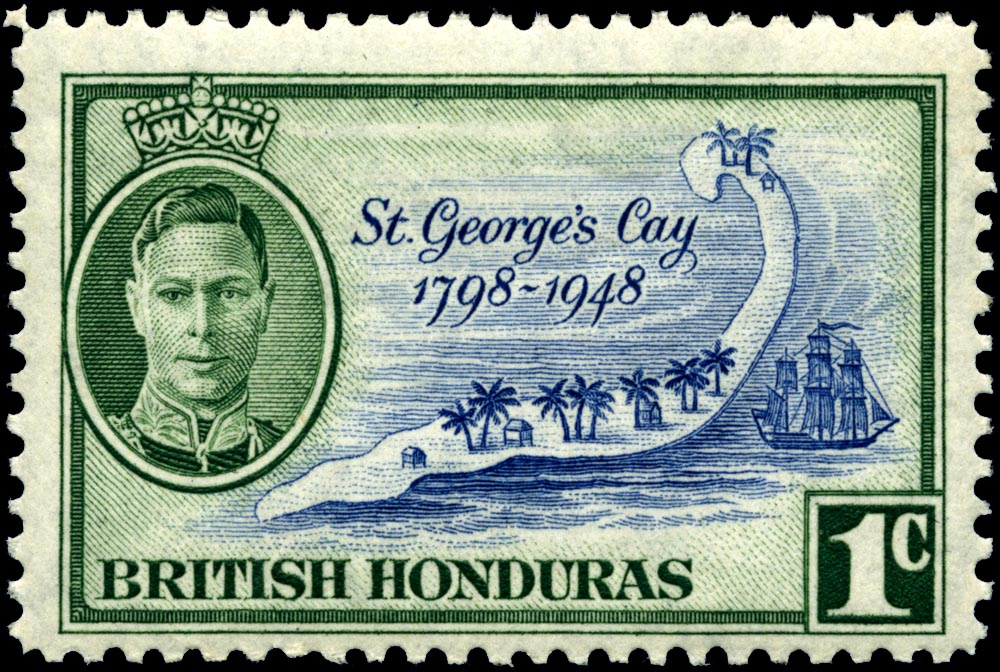
The central pictorial vignette on this 1948 stamp of British Honduras is in blue. The frame is green.

In philately, the vignette is the central part of a postage stamp design, such as, a monarch's head or a pictorial design, which often shades off gradually to the edges of the stamp.

The central vignette is often surrounded by a frame. Often times the vignette and frame are engraved on a single plate, while sometimes there are two separate plates for the frame and vignette, where the vignette may be printed separately and is often of a different color. The plate from which the vignette is printed is known as the vignette plate.

Printing errors have sometimes led to the vignette being inverted. Perhaps the most famous example is the Inverted Jenny.

== Alternative meaning ==
A different use of the term vignette in philately is to describe publicity labels or poster stamps which do not have postal validity, such as those produced in France during World War One by Delandre.

== See also ==
- Vignetting
