= Easter Seals (Canada) =

Group of charitable organizations

In Canada, Easter Seals is a group of charitable organizations which supports the development and advancement of people who are living with different types of disabilities. Founded in 1922 by a group of Rotary Clubs, it sought to emulate the success of the American Easter Seals program.

Today, Easter Seals is set up as a federated structure led by Easter Seals Canada (which represents the organization's national interests), and provincially-licensed member organizations in each of the ten provinces that directly provide a range of programs, and services locally. Across Canada, Easter Seals supports over 40,000 children, youth, adults and their families each year.

The best-known and largest of Easter Seals services are the summer camp programs. There are 12 Easter Seals accessible camp facilities across Canada that are geared towards providing camp opportunities to over 4600 children with physical or mental disabilities, including cerebral palsy, autism, muscular dystrophy, and spina bifida. Set-up and activities offered at the camps differ from location to location but in general, the camps provide participants with opportunities to participate in a range of activities such as: sledge hockey, adaptive archery, basketball, rock climbing, accessible High Ropes, canoeing and rafting, swimming, arts and crafts, music and drama, campfires, camping in a tent, and more. The camps welcome children, youth and adults, and families, and are provided at a heavily subsidized rate or at no cost to the families.

In addition to the summer camps, Easter Seals also provides a range of other programs and services. These differ from province to province but include financial assistance for mobility equipment, assistive devices and technologies such as adaptive computers and communication aids, and wheelchair-accessibility modifications to vehicles and homes; academic bursaries and scholarships; year-round adaptive sports and recreational programs; employment preparation and job training services; respite services and accommodations in urban centers for families travelling for medical treatment; and social enterprise services.

The Easter Seals Drop Zone, a multi-city event, is one of the organization's key fundraisers.

== National programs ==
=== Access 2 Card Program ===
The Access 2 Card Program is an initiative developed by Easter Seals in partnership with Cineplex Entertainment, and administered by Easter Seals. For a fee, persons who are living with permanent disabilities can obtain an Access 2 Card which then provides the cardholder with either a free or a discounted ticket for a support person that is accompanying them while the cardholder pays the regular admission price to the facility. The card is valid at Cineplex movie theatres across Canada and over 500 other entertainment, cultural and recreational venues such as museums, art galleries, zoos, historical sites, and aquariums. There were more than 200,000 users of the card in 2013.

=== Disability Travel Card ===
The Disability Travel Card is a program of Easter Seals which operates in partnership with Via Rail and Coach Canada intended for people with disabilities who require assistance from support personnel while traveling. The card enables the cardholder – the person with permanent disability – to obtain a reduced ticket fare for the support person accompanying them at the time of travel, while the cardholder pays the regular ticket price.

=== Red Shirt Day of Action for Accessibility and Inclusion ===
Red Shirt Day is an initiative of Easter Seals Canada which was first observed in 2019 as part of the Government of Canada's National AccessAbility Week celebrations. The event echoes similar events like Pink Shirt Day (anti-bullying) and Orange Shirt Day (solidarity with Indigenous Peoples in Canada) in that it seeks to honour and value the contributions of Canadians of all abilities, particularly those who are living with disabilities, raise awareness among Canadians of all ages about challenges and barriers that continue to impact the lives of people who are living with disabilities and their families, and promote actions to create an accessible and inclusive society in Canada.

== Awards ==
In 2014, Easter Seals Canada was awarded The Tourism Industry Associate of Ontario’s (TIAO) Award of Excellence for Accessible Tourism for its Access 2 Card and Disability Travel Card programs. Easter Seals is the first recipient of this award, which recognises efforts made to make tourism destinations available to all Canadians, regardless of abilities.

== Sports Celebrities Dinner ==
In the early 1950s, Ivan Miller and Bobby Hewitson organized the Ontario Sportswriters and Sportscasters Association (OSSA), and established the annual OSSA Sports Celebrities Dinner for charity. The first dinner was held on March 13, 1952, benefitting the Ontario Society for Crippled Children. The Sports Celebrities Dinner later became the Rogers-Conn Smythe Sports Celebrities Dinner & Auction in support of Easter Seals.

== See also ==
- Harbour Haunt
- Easter seals (philately)
