= Hotel post =

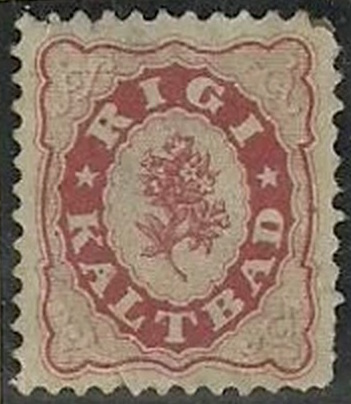
Hotel Rigi Kaltbad hotel stamp

Hotel Post was a service offered by remote Swiss hotels for the carriage of mail to the nearest official post office.

== Origins ==
In the nineteenth century, Switzerland developed an important tourist industry. Some hotels in remote areas that were not serviced by the Swiss Post Office offered a service to guests of carrying their mail to the nearest official post office for a fee paid by the purchase of a specially printed stamp. The first hotel stamp was issued by Rigi Kaltbad in 1864, followed by hotels at Rigi Scheideck, Belalp, Kurort Stoos, Maderanerthal and Rigi Kulm.

== Last usage in Switzerland ==
These services became unnecessary as the Swiss railway was extended and a normal postal service introduced. After 20 September 1883, all remaining services were prohibited by the Swiss government.

== Use in other countries ==
Hotels in several other countries have issued stamps including in Austria, Hungary, Egypt (Shepheard's Hotel, Cairo), Japan (The Imperial Hotel, Tokyo), Romania and Singapore (Raffles Hotel). In Hungary stamps were issued at Carpathian resorts for Kurhaus auf der Hohen Rinne between 1895 and 1926, Magura in 1903 and 1911, and Bistra in 1909 to 1912. These resorts were part of Rumania after World War One. In Austria stamps were issued for Kesselfall-Alpenhaus and Moserboden between 1927 and 1938 and Katschberghohe in 1933-38. Stamps were also issued at a hotel in the Kulmi Mountain region of Liechtenstein.

== Classification ==
Hotel stamps are regarded as local or cinderella stamps.
