= Circular delivery company =

Early alternative postal service

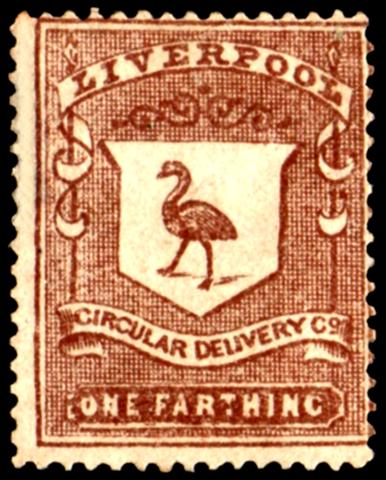
An 1867 one farthing stamp from the Liverpool Circular Delivery Company.

In postal history, a circular delivery company was a type of company which operated in Great Britain between 1865 and 1869 to deliver circulars and other printed matter at rates lower than the British Post Office charged. The service was outlawed in 1869 and a new cheaper postage rate for printed matter was introduced in 1870. The stamps issued by the companies are much sought after by philatelists.

== Origins ==
The first such company was the Edinburgh and Leith Circular Delivery Company set up by Robert Brydone in 1865. Brydone undertook to deliver circulars within the boundaries of Edinburgh and Leith for one farthing each. He also delivered parcels which were not covered by the Post Office's monopoly. Brydone, a printer by trade, was declared bankrupt in 1866 but moved to London to form the London Circular Delivery Company which merged with the Metropolitan Circular Delivery Company in 1867.

== Spread ==
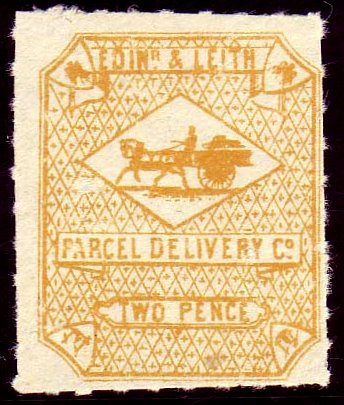
A 2d stamp of the Edinburgh & Leith Parcel Delivery Company.

Further companies soon sprang up, some of which were connected with Brydone. They included:

- Aberdeen Circular Delivery Company
- Circular Delivery Company Limited
- Clarke & Co. Edinburgh
- Dundee Circular Delivery Company
- Edinburgh & Leith Parcel Delivery Company
- Glasgow Circular Delivery Company
- Liverpool Circular Delivery Company
- London & Metropolitan Circular Delivery Company
- National Circular Delivery Company

== Demise ==
The spread of the circular delivery companies soon attracted the attention of the Post Office who had a legal monopoly on the collection and delivery of letters. In August 1867 the Post Office brought a legal action against the London & Metropolitan Circular Delivery Company for infringing their monopoly, which case they won, and the various companies are thought to have stopped operating by September 1867.

== Legacy ==
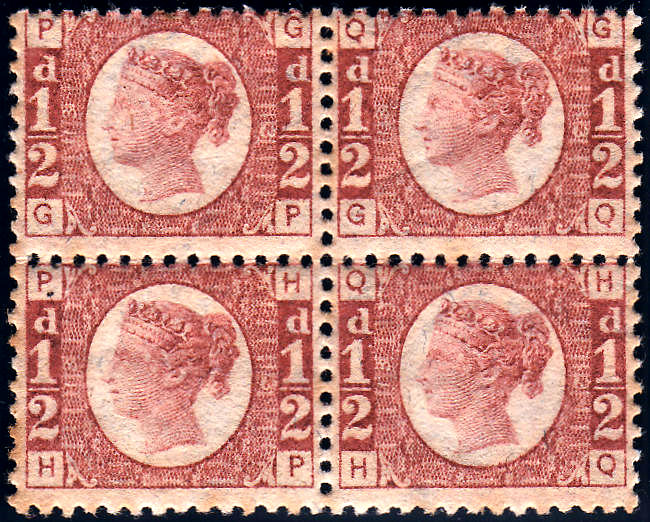
The Post Office half penny "bantam" stamp introduced in 1870 for printed papers.

The demand for cheaper rates for printed materials was self-evident and on 1 October 1870 the British Post Office issued the first half penny stamp to pay the new reduced charge for printed papers, the small 1/2d bantam.

== Collecting ==
The stamps appear only in specialist catalogues. Many are thought to have been forged and some may have been produced purely for philatelic purposes and to have never seen genuine use. For these reasons, collectors prefer to collect the stamps on cover, however, such covers are rare. The stamps are classed as cinderellas or stamps for a local post.
