= Festiniog Railway Letter Service =

The Festiniog Railway Letter Service is an officially authorised service within the United Kingdom railway system for posting and transmission of letters, and under certain circumstances also delivering the letters directly to intended recipients. The service operates on the Ffestiniog Railway and the Welsh Highland Railway in North Wales and similar services are operated on the Talyllyn Railway and other heritage railways in the UK. The service was also offered until 1984 by British Railways as successors to the many constituent railway companies that had in 1891 signed an agreement with the G.P.O. and it was BR that regulated the terms and the charges in conjunction with the post office.

The service was fully described in the Post Office Guide and the July 1969 edition (August 1969 2nd Supplement) reported that the service was available at stations on British Rail; Ravenglass and Eskdale Railway; Festiniog Railway (summer only); Talyllyn Railway (summer only) and Northern Ireland Railways. Now. with the railways expansion, i.e. operating a longer line, a longer season, and with the reopening of the Welsh Highland line, the service now operates all year round.

== FR RLS history ==
The service originated in 1891 when the FR Co. was party to an agreement on the carriage of Railway Letters made between the G.P.O. and most of the British Railway Companies (operating through the Railway Clearing House). The agreement specifies firstly the conditions under which the service is permitted to operate and secondly the provision of a label (supplied by each participating railway company) to be affixed to the face of the letter. Railway Letters must bear the full G.P.O. Royal Mail First Class Letter Postage as well as the Railway Letter Fee.

The agreement, permitting the carriage of letters more quickly than by the normal postal service, became effective nationally on 1 February 1891 and the FR Co. signed the agreement on 28 May 1891. The FR Co. copy survived and was located in 1968 by the Company Archivist, Michael Seymour. The Postmaster General apparently could not confirm the continuing validity of the 1891 agreement, but accepted the copy the FR had, between the FR Co. and the G.P.O., was still valid, and the service was reinstated on 28 May 1969.

FR Railway Letter Fee labels (stamps), for the reinstatement of the service, were designed by volunteer Michael Seymour, the FR Co. Archivist (as were all subsequent stamps and pictorial cancellations until his death in February 1999). The stamps, and many later issues, were printed by T. Stephenson & Sons Ltd. Festiniog Railway Letters were initially accepted at the following stations when staffed – Porthmadog, Dduallt, and Tan-y-bwlch, and also on the trains. A First Day Cover service was introduced and covers were for over thirty years serviced for all G.P.O. Commemorative and Welsh Regional issues as well as for FR issues and special events on the railway. Recently this level of business has been curtailed, as the numbers issued by Royal Mail has increased, and the company has concentrated more on FR stamps and special FR events. This has changed with the expansion on the Welsh Highland line, and other opportunities changes in the postal system brings. It is still operated as a volunteer non profit operation, for the benefit of the company.

== General RLS history ==
Under the Railway Letter Service, a letter could be passed from train to train and railway to railway until it was finally collected at a station, or posted at a station local to the addressee. The original commercial advantage of the scheme rested on it being quicker and more reliable than the ordinary G.P.O. service. Anyone with an important document urgently required elsewhere (usually London) could consult Bradshaw and discover the next train from the local station offering a connection with a train to London (or wherever) and they could then hand in the letter at the local station, secure in the knowledge that the recipient (whom they informed by telephone or telegraph) could collect it on arrival by the specified train. The G.P.O./Royal Mail insisted that the normal postage be paid with Post Office stamps in addition to any railway letter fee and this condition continues.

In the late 19th century most British railway companies offered the service and many produced specific railway letter labels (stamps) as required by the agreement. As time went on most companies, including BR, resorted to the use of parcel labels, often with hand written values, or latterly rubber stamps.

Until 1974, BR set the Railway Letter Fee (a complex fare structure) and this was often changed without warning or notice. The basic fee was thus increased with immediate effect from 1s. 2d. to 1s. 3d. on 26 May 1969 – just two days before the reintroduction of the service on the FR. Fortunately the FR had taken the trouble to provide themselves with 1d, 6d, 1/- and also 1s. 2d. stamps. Extra 1d and a new 1s. 3d. stamps were soon ordered from the printers.

The heritage railways, tired of BR frequently upping the charge by a penny, BR had long since given up using priced stamps or labels, sought changes. A new agreement between the Post Office, the Association of Minor Railways, British Rail and Northern Ireland Railways became effective on 3 June 1974. The agreement allowed the minor railways (Association of Independent Railways Ltd) to fix a fee independently of BR. Under the agreement, BR also benefited since it was no longer required to accept letters from a minor railway without the payment of an additional fee. Changing commercial circumstances caused BR to withdraw completely from this nationwide service on 8 June 1984. The Ffestiniog Railway and other heritage railways continued to offer this service. At the insistence of the Royal Mail, a new agreement, a separate contract between the Royal Mail and each participating heritage railway company, was introduced on 18 December 1998.

== Collecting ==
In philatelic circles, these stamps are generally classed as cinderella issues.

Examples of early Victorian railway letter fee stamps, and later, are to be seen in the National Philatelic Collection in London. On the first day of the FR's reintroduced Railway Letter Service, a railway letter, enclosing sheets of the stamps, was dispatched to H.M. The Queen. A reply was later received, stating that The Queen has been graciously pleased to accept the stamps for inclusion in the Royal Philatelic Collection.

== See also ==
- Railway stamp
