= Louis-Eugène Mouchon =

Mouchon, Louis-Eugène
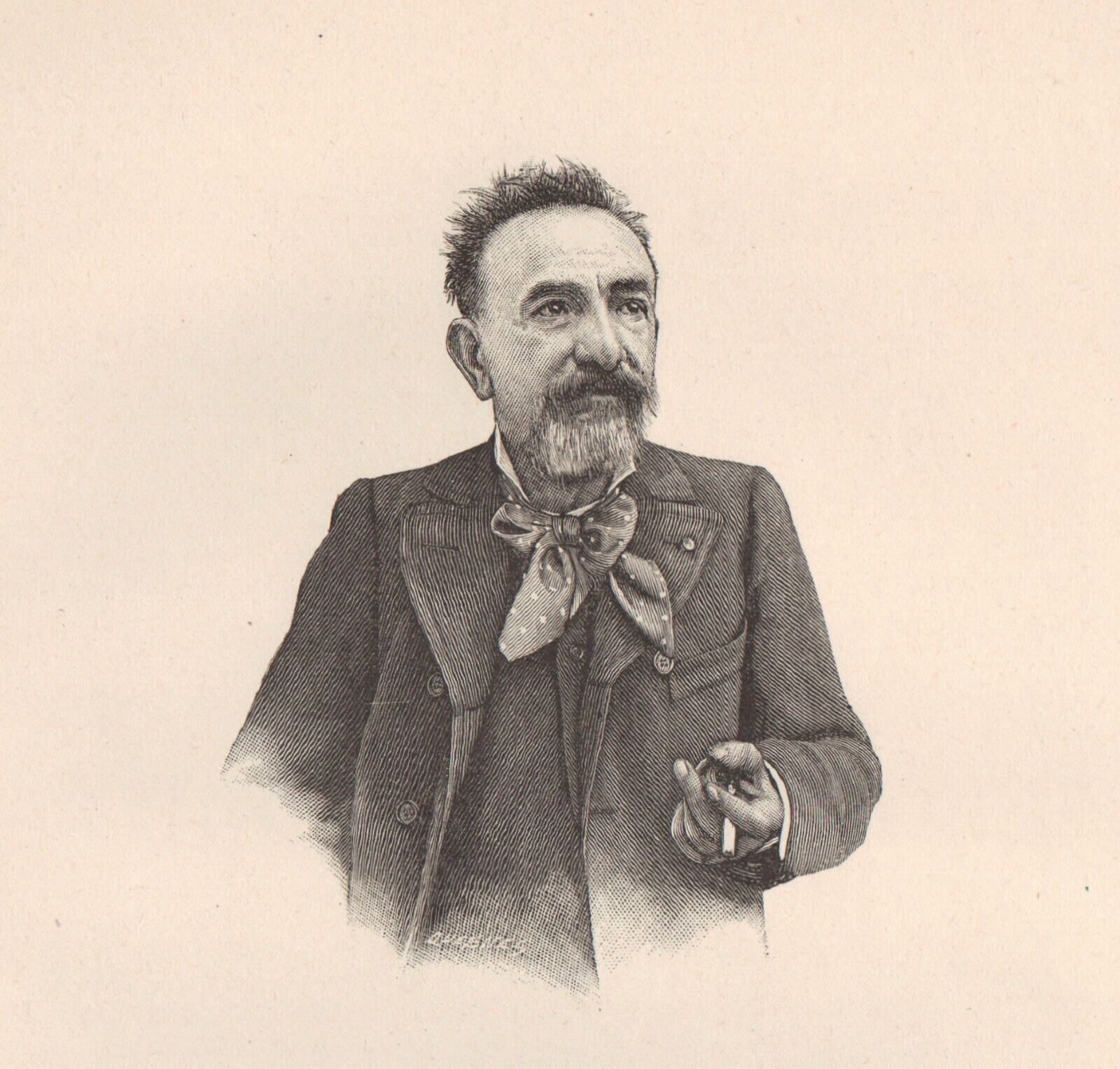
- Born: 30.08.1843; Paris, France
- Died: 03.03.1914; Montrouge, Hauts-de-Seine, France
- Occupations: Graphic artist Painter; Engraver; Medalist
- Awards: knight of the Legion of Honor (1895); Grand prize for engraving (1900)

Louis-Eugène Mouchon (30 August 1843, in Paris – 1914) was a French painter, graphic artist, medalist, engraver and sculptor. He created state papers, stamps, coins, currency and medals. He was the son and pupil of Louis Claude Mouchon, the painter. He exhibited at the Salon from 1876 onwards and became an Associate of the Artistes Francais in 1888. His most famous stamps are the Mouchon series and the Navigation & Commerce series of French postage stamps. His medals can be found in the collection of several museums.

== Postage stamps ==
Next to stamps for France, Mouchon also designed for Abyssinia, Argentina, Belgium (Brussels Exhibition), Greece, Guatemala, Luxemburg, Monaco, the Netherlands, Persia, Portugal and colonies, Russia and Serbia.

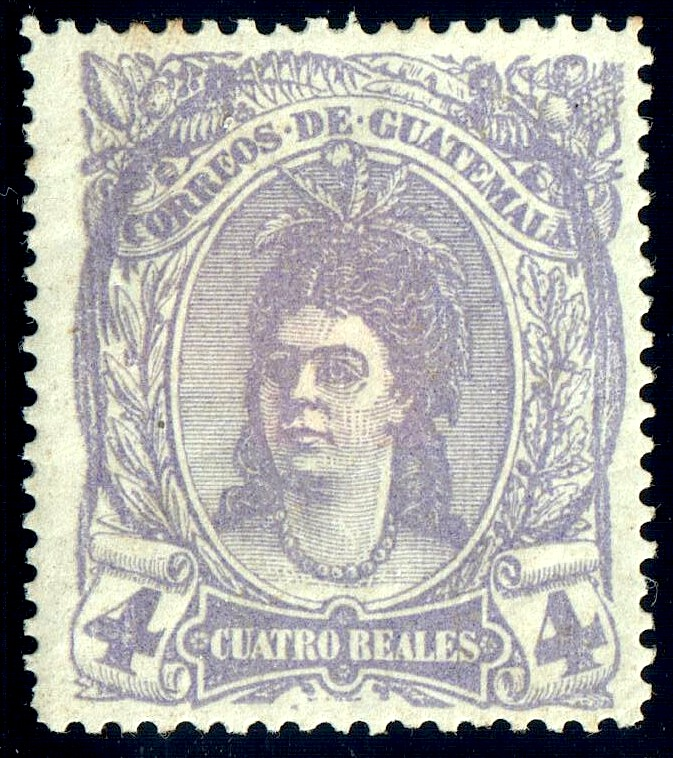
For the Guatemala 1878 series

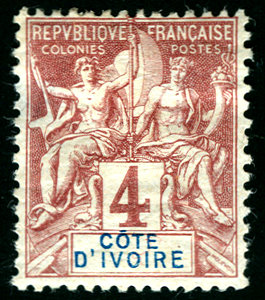
A 4c stamp for Côte d'Ivoire of the Navigation & Commerce series, 1892.

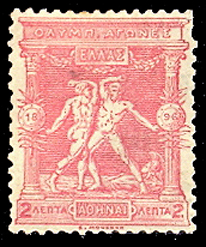
Stamp of the Olympic Games in Athens, 1896

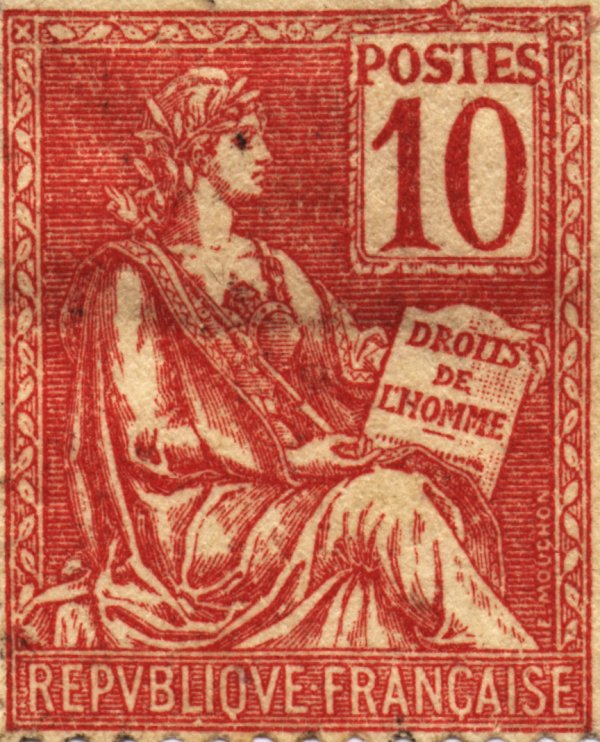
The Mouchon type of France, first issued in 1900.

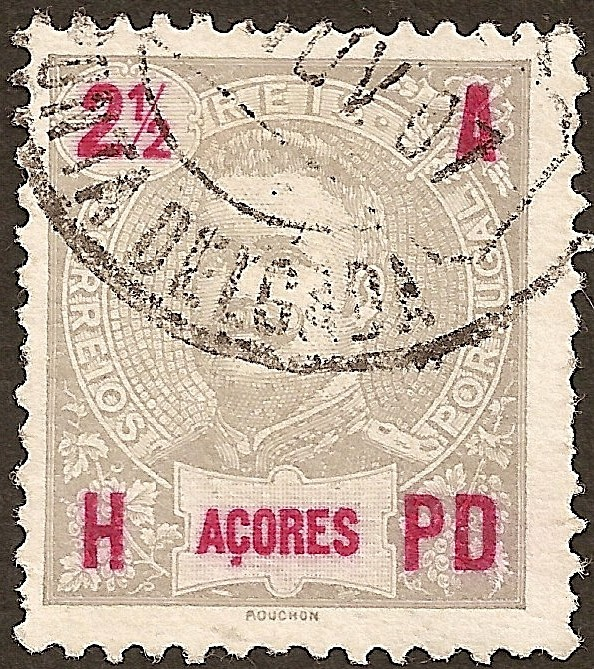
A stamp for the Azores 1906 engraved by Mouchon.

== Medals and currency ==
Mouchon entered the field of medal making at the age of forty three. He was made a knight of the Legion of Honor in 1895 and won the grand prize for engraving at the Universal Exposition in Paris, 1900. He designed coins and the plates for currency for Portugal.

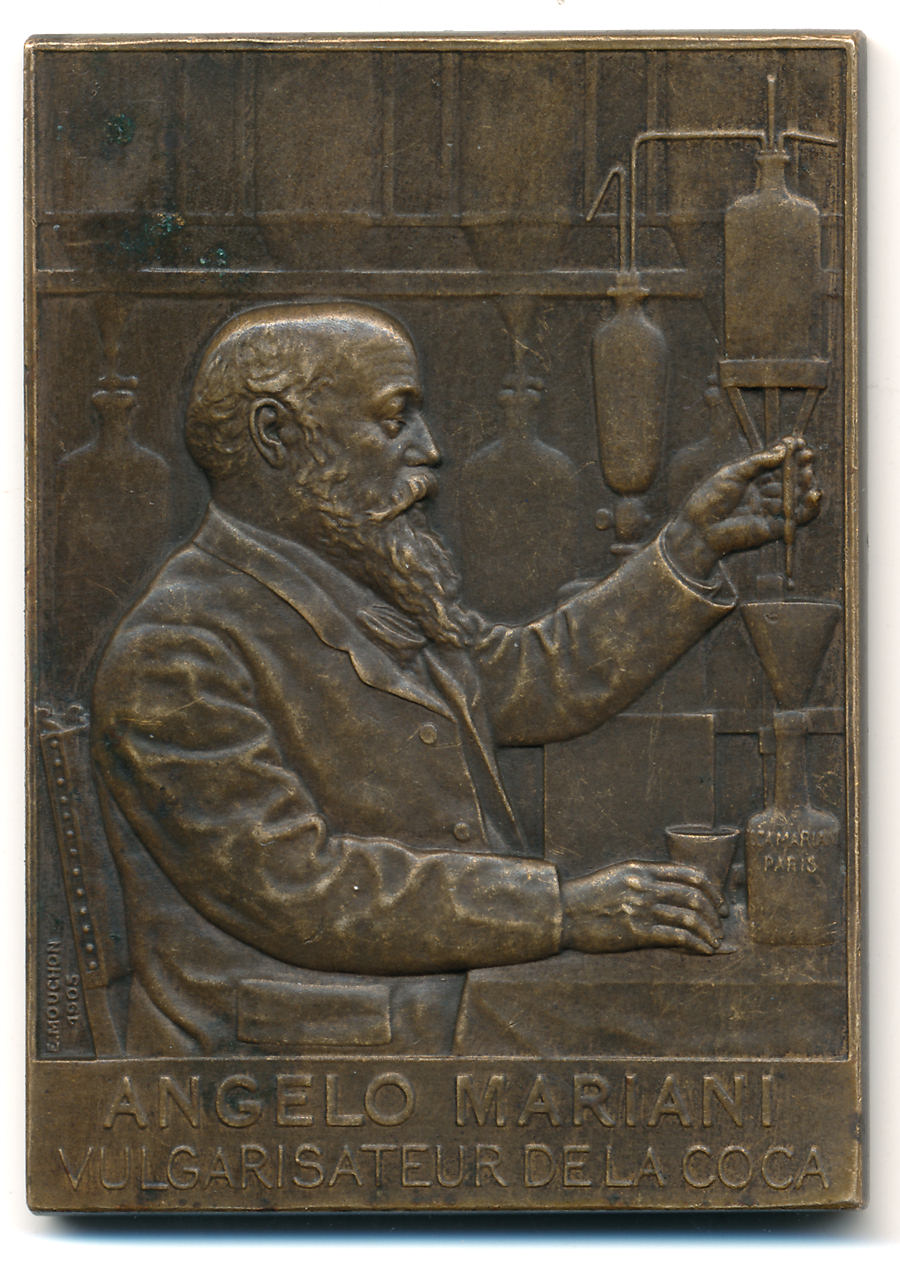
1905, Angelo Mariani and the use of coca leaf in Vin Mariani, proprietary medicine. Bronze, 37 x 52mm.

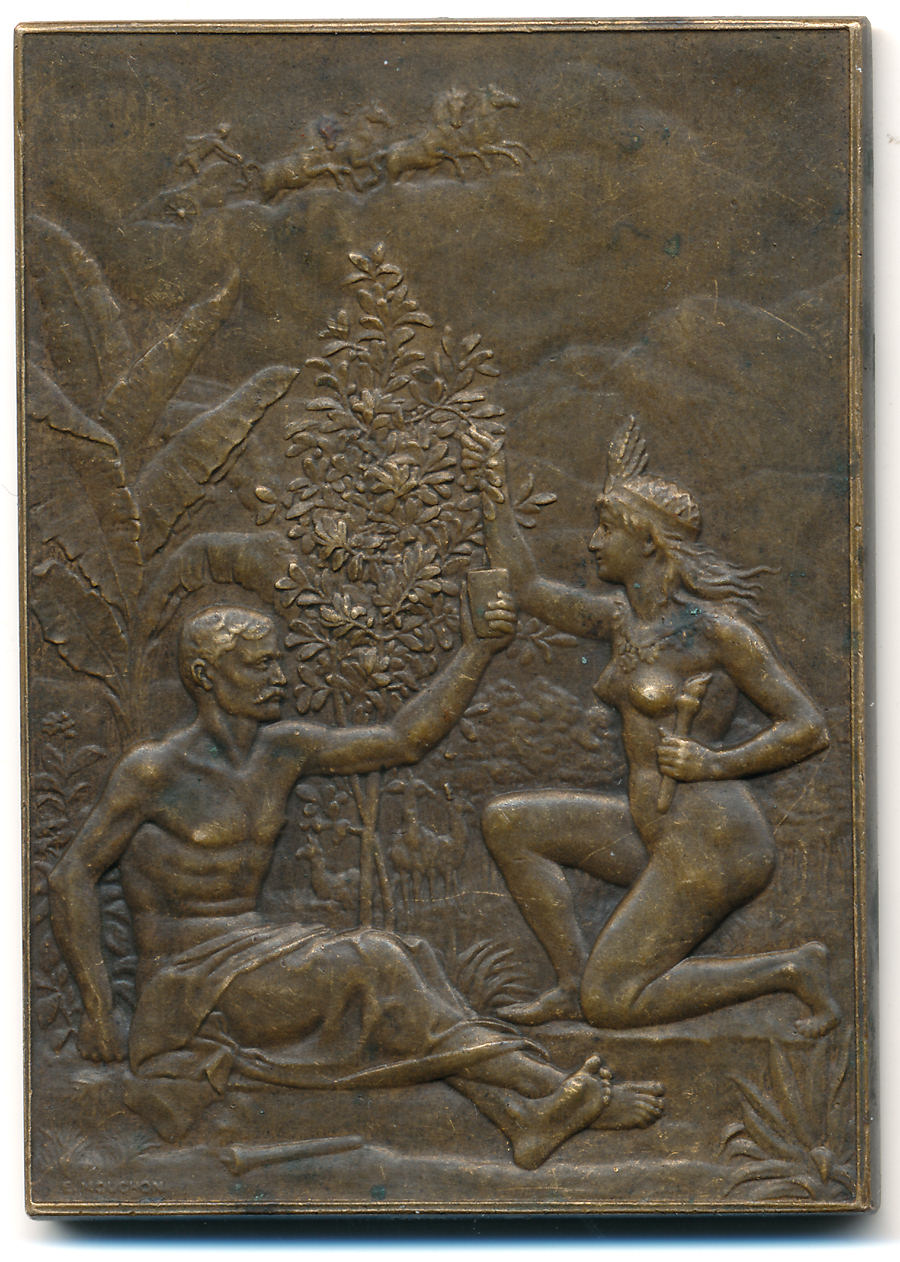
1905, Angelo Mariani and the use of coca leaf. Bronze, 37 x 52mm.

== See also ==
- Jules Auguste Sage
- Postage stamps and postal history of France
