= Campbell-Johnston Collection =

The Campbell-Johnston Collection is a collection of poster stamps that forms part of the British Library Philatelic Collections. It consists of 30 large green albums.
