= Jules Auguste Sage =

French poet, artist, and sculptor

- Born: March 16, 1829; Paris
- Died: October 13, 1908 (aged 79); Paris
- Occupations: Sculptor, artist
- Years active: 1870–1901
- Notable work: Type Sage postage stamps

Jules Auguste Sage (Paris, 16 March 1829 - Paris, 13 October 1908) (Note: Sage's birth and death dates are listed as 1840–1910 in this source) was a French poet, artist and sculptor. He is known for giving his name to a type of French postage stamp, Type Sage, first issued in 1876.

== Life ==
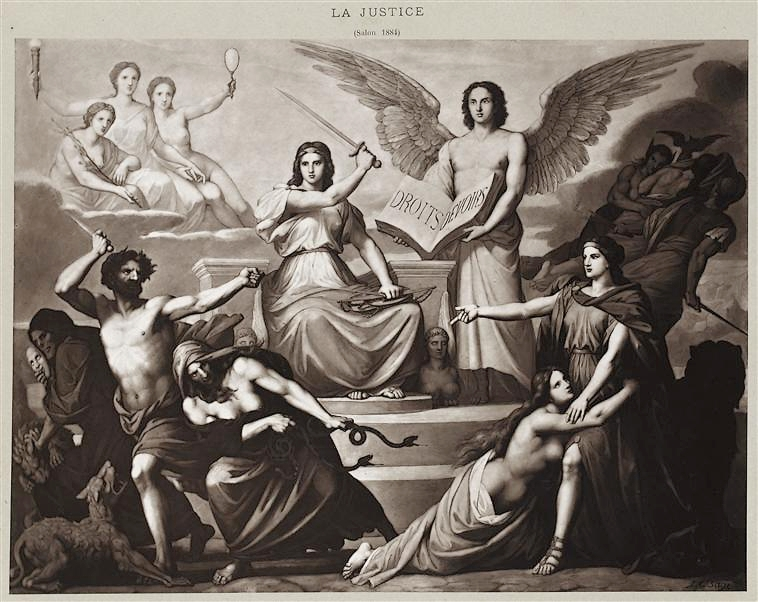
Period photograph of La Justice, the painting by Sage presented at the 1884 Salon.

Sage exhibited at the Paris Salons between 1870 and 1901 and became a member of the Société des artistes français in 1883.

== Stamps ==
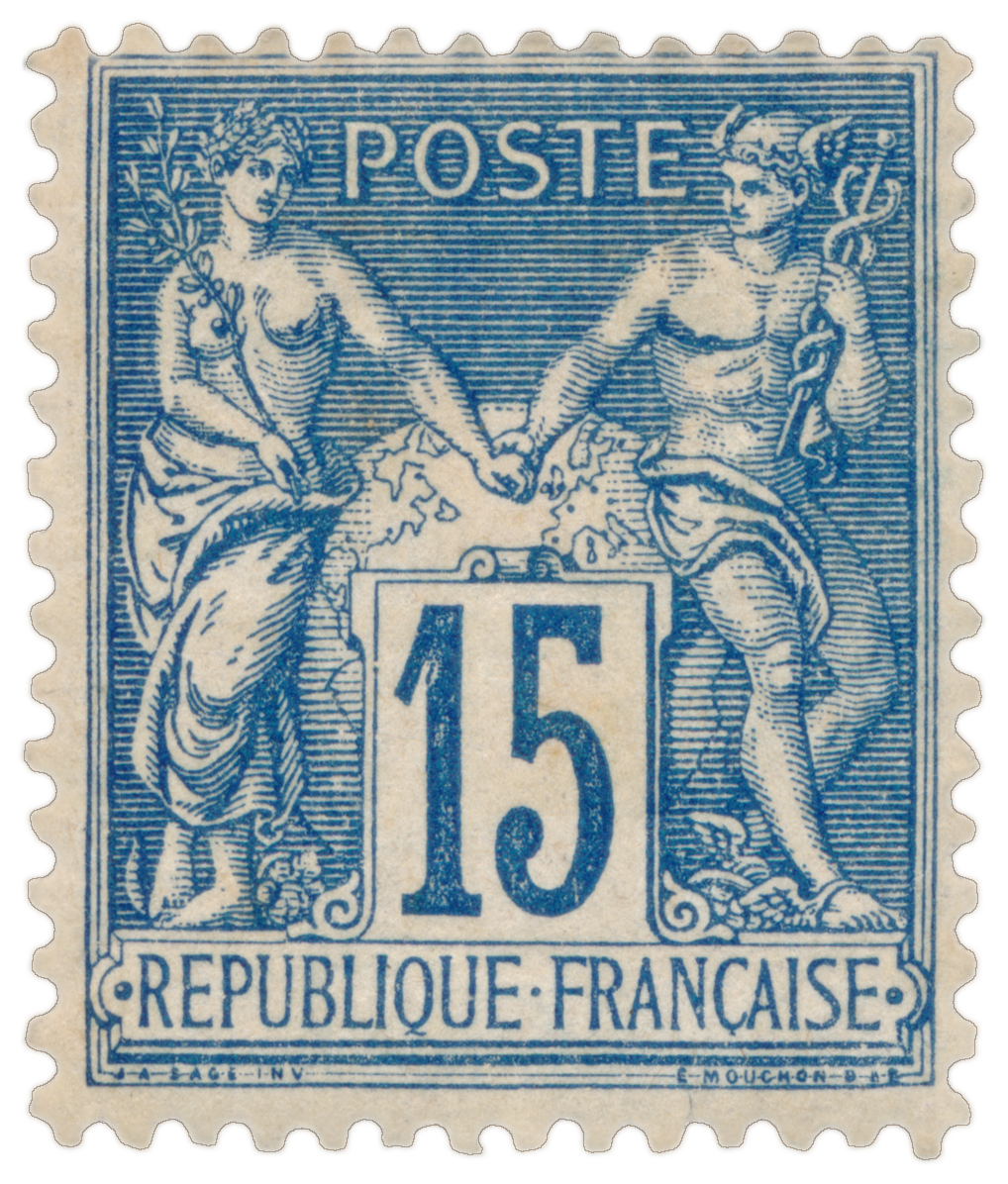
Type Sage: 15 centimes, issued in 1892

He designed the Type Sage postage stamps, also referred as the Peace and Commerce issue that the postal administration selected in a competition. The engraving was made by Louis-Eugène Mouchon. These stamps were a replacement for both the Ceres series that had lasted from 1849 to 1851 in different forms, and the Napoleon III stamps. The Type Sage were in use 1876 until 1900 and were the only stamps in use denominated from 1 centimes to 5 francs with intervening denominates of, 2¢, 4¢, 5¢, 10¢, 15¢, 20¢, 25¢, 30¢, 40¢ and 75¢. His name appears, in very small type, in the bottom left corner of the stamps and Mouchon is attributed in the right corner. In 1900 they were replaced by the Type Blanc, named after their designer Paul Joseph Blanc.

== Publications ==
- Poésies diverses [Miscellaneous poems]. Paris: éditions Édouard Dentu. 1885. BnF 31276828b
- Les Destinées de l'homme, esquisse. Paris: printed by H. Jouve. 1887. BnF 312768270
