= Jean-François Brun =

French philatelist

- Born: 14 May 1943 (age 82)
- Occupation: Philatelist

Jean-François Brun (born 14 May 1943) is a French philatelist who was appointed to the Roll of Distinguished Philatelists in 1998.
