= Easter seals (philately) =

Form of charity label

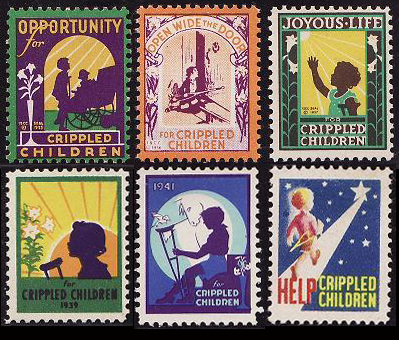
American Easter seals from the 1930s

An Easter seal is a form of charity label issued to raise funds for charitable purposes. They are issued by the Easterseals charity in the United States, and by the Canadian Easter Seals charities.

Easter seals are applied to the front of mail to show support for particular charitable causes. They are distributed along with appeals to donate to the charities they support.

Easter seals are a form of Cinderella stamp. They do not have any postal value.
