= Charity label =

Stamp sold by a charity to raise funds

A charity label is a label resembling a postage stamp, sold by charities to raise funds. They are generally intended to be used on mail, as a way of advertising the sender's support of the charity's cause.

Christmas Seals and Easter Seals are perhaps the two best-known types, although many kinds have been made.

While designed to look like postage stamps, they only rarely include a denomination, and never the name of a country. They are distinct from charity stamps which also include a charge for postage.

Charity labels are one of several kinds of cinderella stamp.

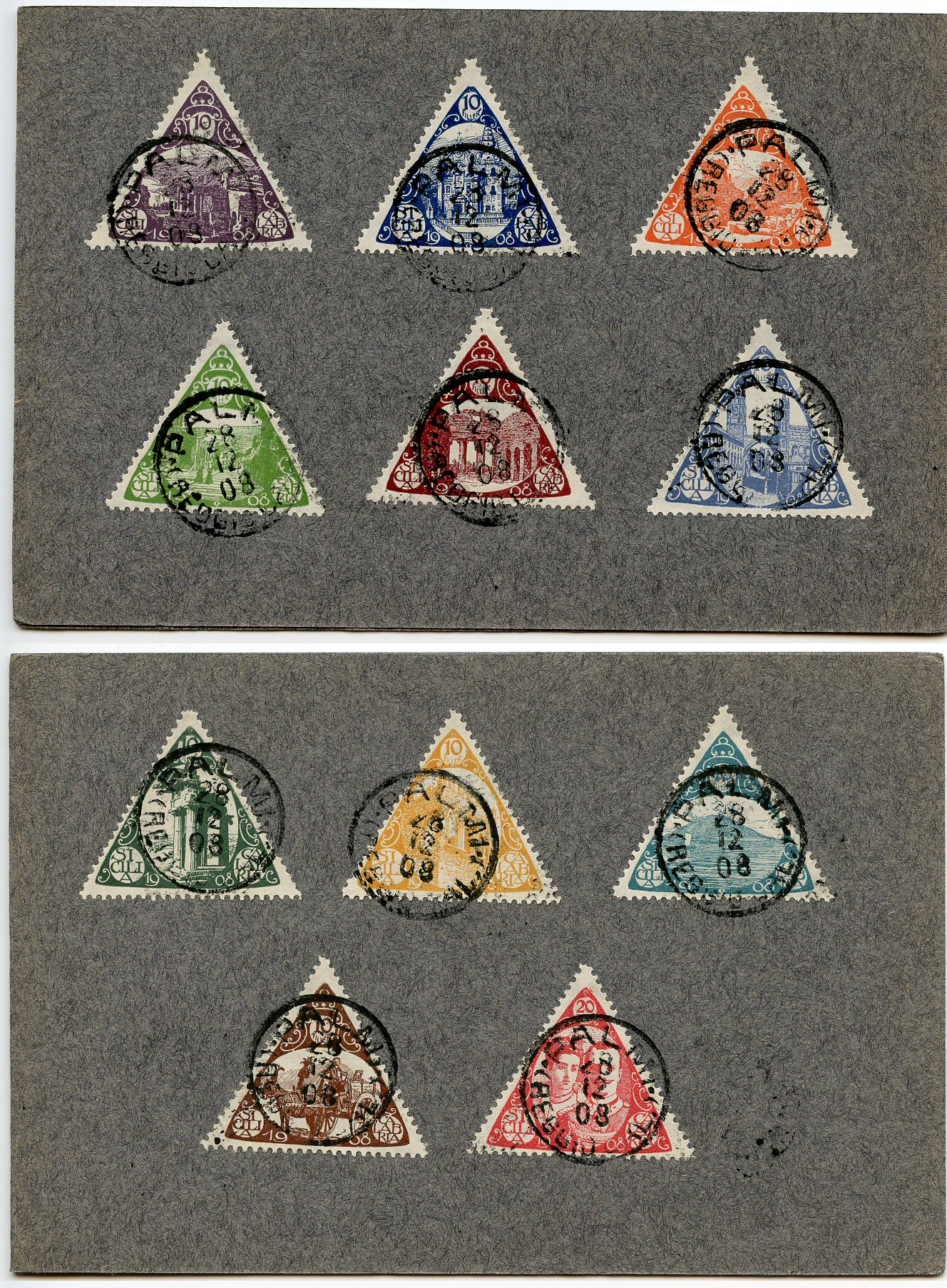
Italy 1908, Messina earthquake charity labels

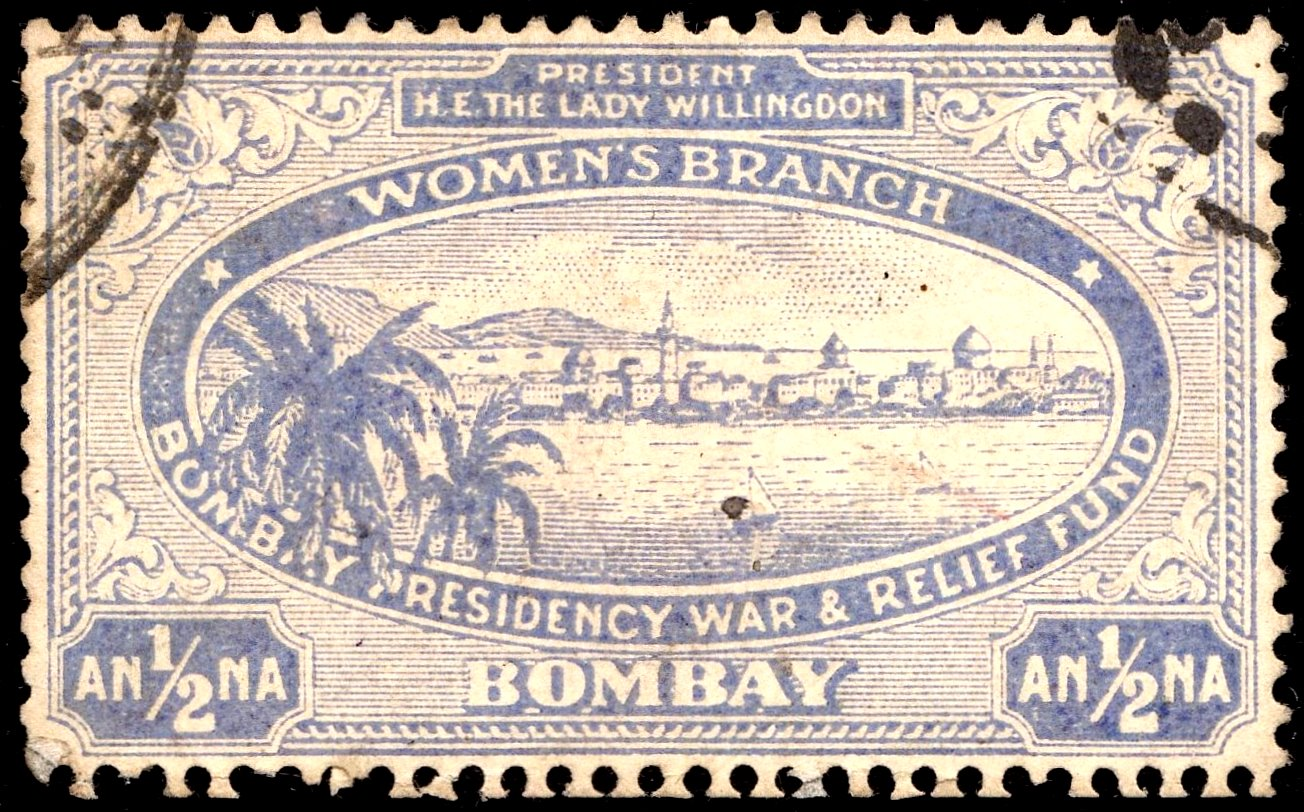
India 1916, Bombay Presidency War and Relief Fund half anna charity label

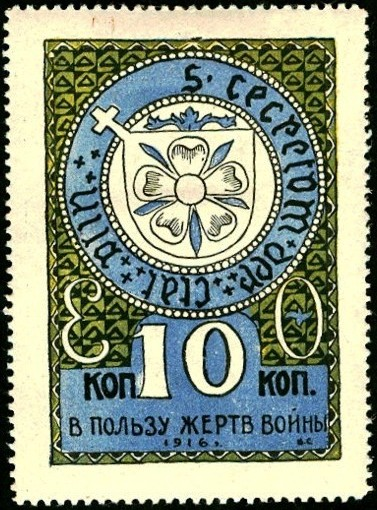
Russia 1916, 10 kopecks War victims charity label of Fellin
