= Denomination (postage stamp) =

Face value of a stamp

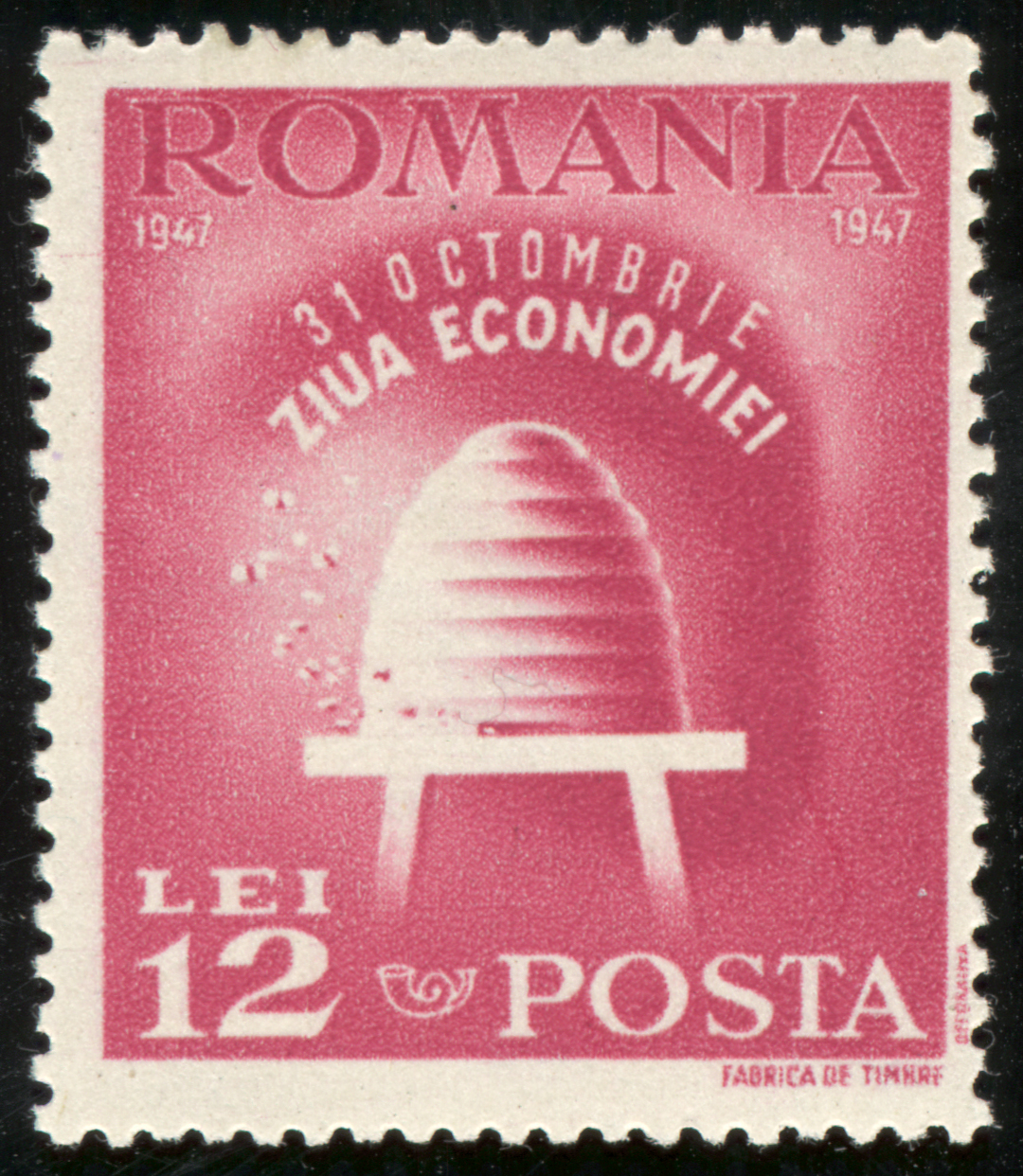
A Romanian stamp from 1947 showing a denomination of 12 Lei.

In philately, the denomination is the "inscribed value of a stamp".

The denomination is not the same as the value of a stamp on the philatelic market, which is usually different, and the denominations of a country's stamps and money do not necessarily match. For instance, there might be a 47¢ stamp to pay a particular postal rate but there is unlikely to be a 47¢ coin.

== No denomination shown ==
Where no denomination is shown, it may be because the stamp is deliberately non-denominated to pay the cost of a particular service, or because the stamp is not a postage stamp. It might be a cinderella stamp of some kind such as a poster stamp or charity label.

=== Letter-denominated first-class stamps ===
Faced in 1978 with the problem of supplying stamps to satisfy an anticipated postal rate increase that had not yet been specifically determined, the United States Postal Service issued a stamp bearing the letter "A" instead of a numerical denomination, announcing that this stamp would cover whatever new first-class postal rate was approved by congress. Subsequent decades saw the issue of B, C, D, E, F, G and H stamps that similarly covered the periodic later rate increases.

=== Forever stamps ===
In 2007 the United States Postal Service issued its first undenominated "Forever stamp", which was guaranteed to remain valid for first-class postage despite any and all future postal rate increases. By 2011, the vast majority of new U. S. postal issues were forever stamps, although some new stamps still carried specific denominations. In 2015 the forever stamp was expanded into all other stamps (additional ounce, postcard, non-machinable surcharge, two ounce and three ounce) and stamps either have their intended purpose or the word "FOREVER" printed on them instead of a denomination.

== Changes of denomination ==
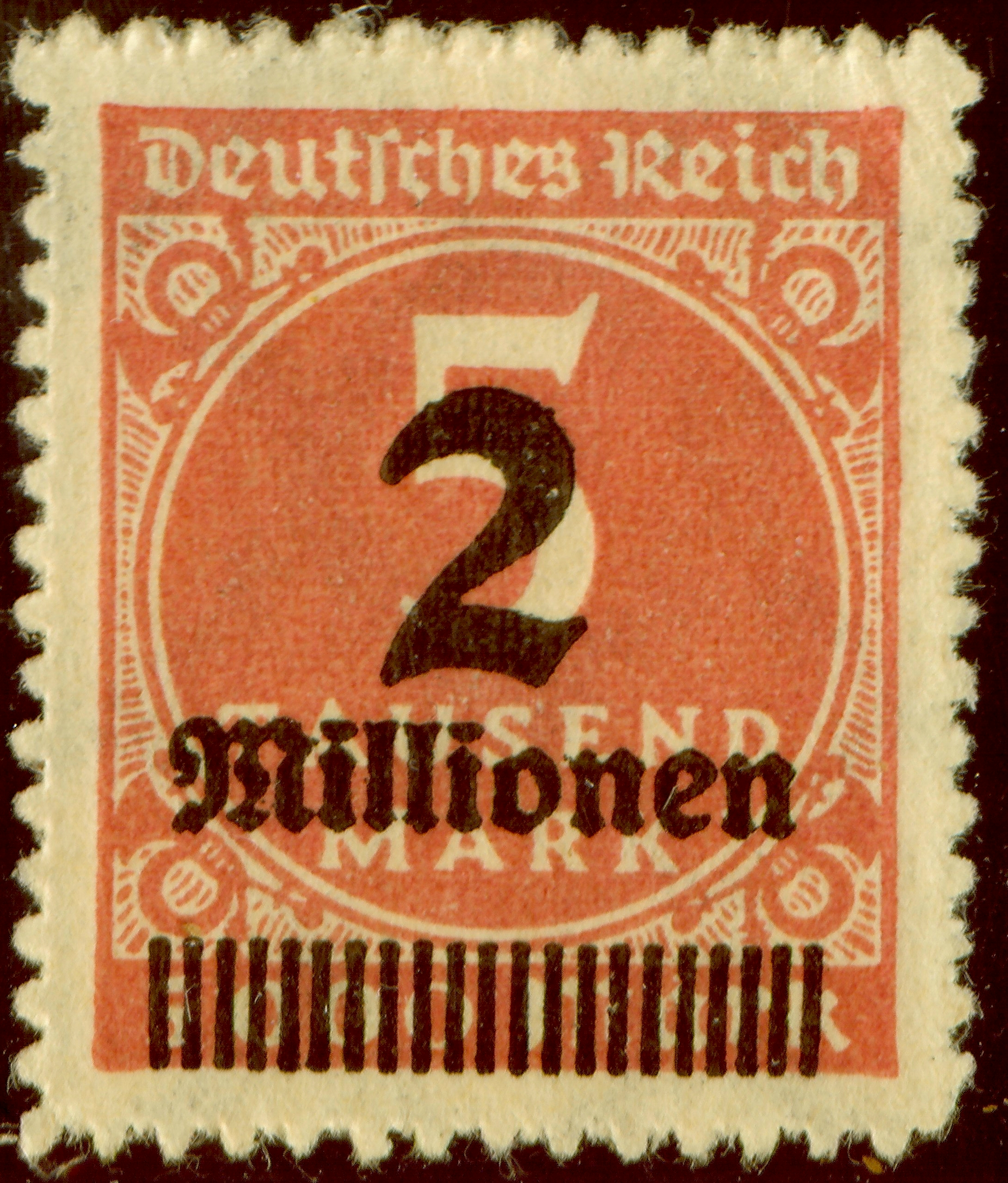
German hyperinflation surcharge 1923. A 5 thousand mark stamp overprinted to change it to 2 million marks.

Sometimes a stamp may have its denomination changed by the post office due to local circumstances. For instance, stocks of one value may be overprinted to show a different value due to stock shortages. In cases of hyper-inflation stamps have had their denomination changed by overprinting as existing denominations became worthless. In other cases, changes to the local currency have led to changes in denomination. For instance, when the Ryukyu Islands (at the time a United States protectorate) changed its currency from Yen to Dollars, a number of airmail stamps originally printed with Yen values were overprinted and re-denominated to cents in 1959–1960.

== Hyperinflation Denominations ==
During periods of hyperinflation, non-overprinted postage stamps of extraordinary denominations have been issued. As one example, in Hungary, on 15 July 1946 an AP40,000 (Hungarian adópengő) stamp featuring a diesel locomotive was issued. This was the equivalent of 80 quadrillion pengő (P80,000,000,000,000,000,000,000,000)

== See also ==
- Bisects and splits (philately)
- Face value
- Non-denominated postage
- Semi-postal
- Franking
