= Jean-Auguste Barre =

French sculptor and medalist

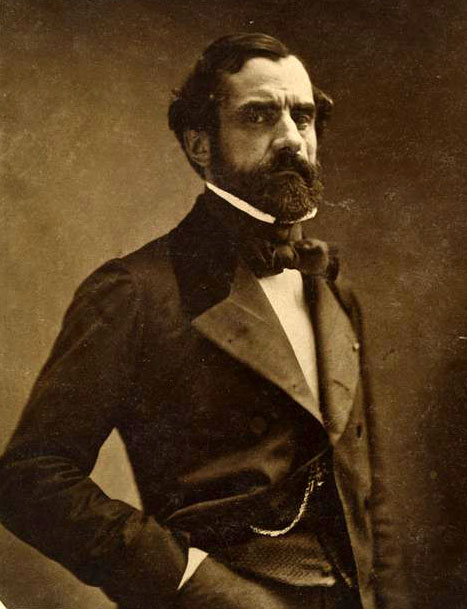
Jean-Auguste Barre in 1896 by Félix Nadar .

Jean Auguste Barre (25 September 1811 – 5 February 1896) was a French sculptor and medalist. Born in Paris, he was trained by his father Jean-Jacques Barre (1793–1855), a medalist. In 1879, he succeeded his brother Albert Désiré Barre as the 19th Chief engraver of the Monnaie de Paris, though he held the position for only one year. He was succeeded by Jean Lagrange.

Barre studied at the École nationale supérieure des Beaux-Arts in Paris under Jean-Pierre Cortot, and he is mainly known as a portrait sculptor.

Exhibiting at the French Salon from 1831 to 1886, his first showings were of medallions and medals. Barre is known to be one of the first sculptors to make miniatures of famous contemporaries, such as Napoleon III, Queen Victoria, dancers Marie Taglioni and Emma Livry, and Susan B. Anthony. His bronze works are on display in such places as the Louvre and the Cleveland Art Museum.

One of his stone works is found in the cemetery of Père Lachaise Cemetery, where he did a bust for the tomb of his friend Alfred de Musset.

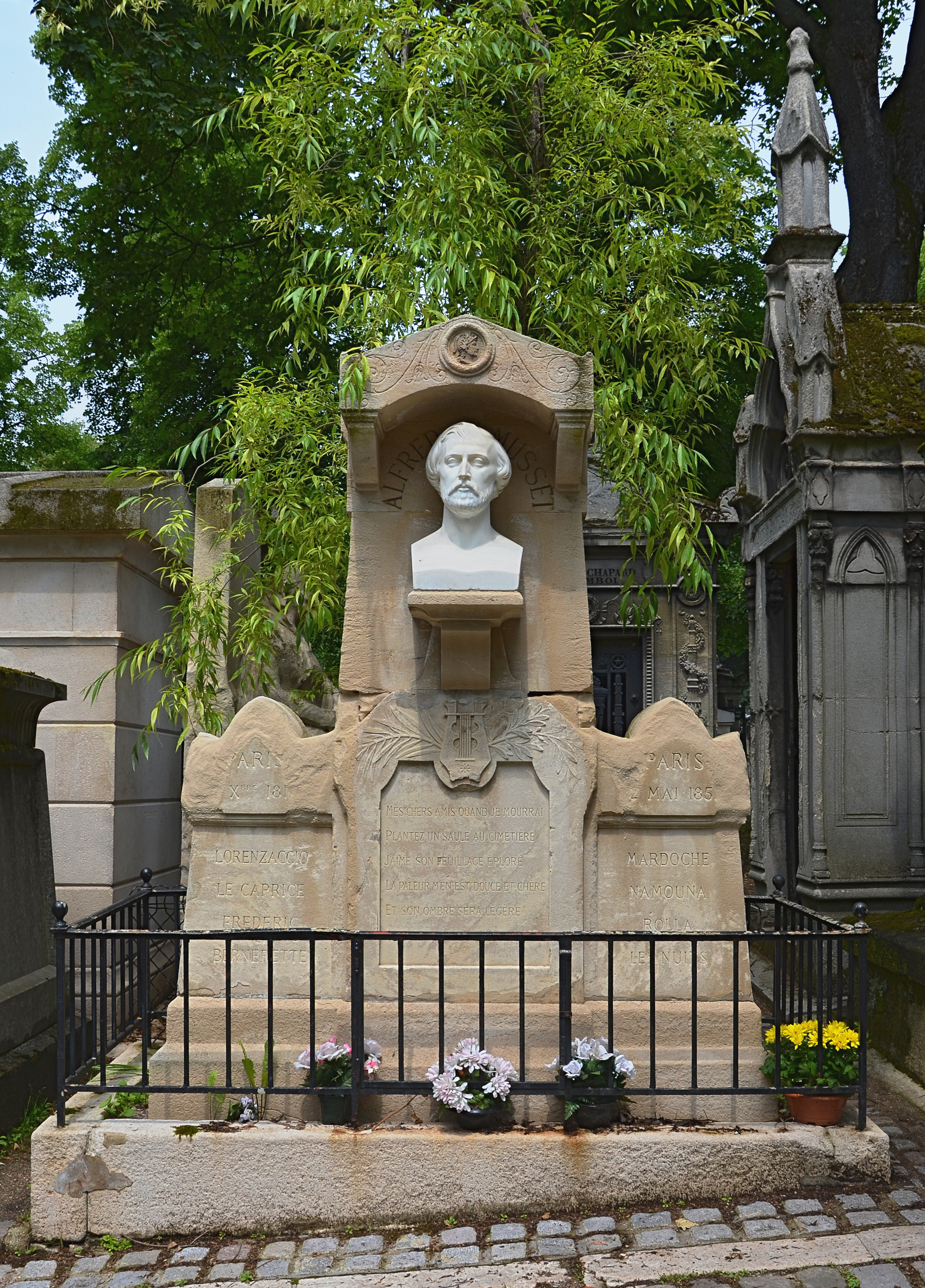
Tomb of Alfred de Musset by Barre, Père Lachaise Cemetery, Paris

He died in Paris in 1896.

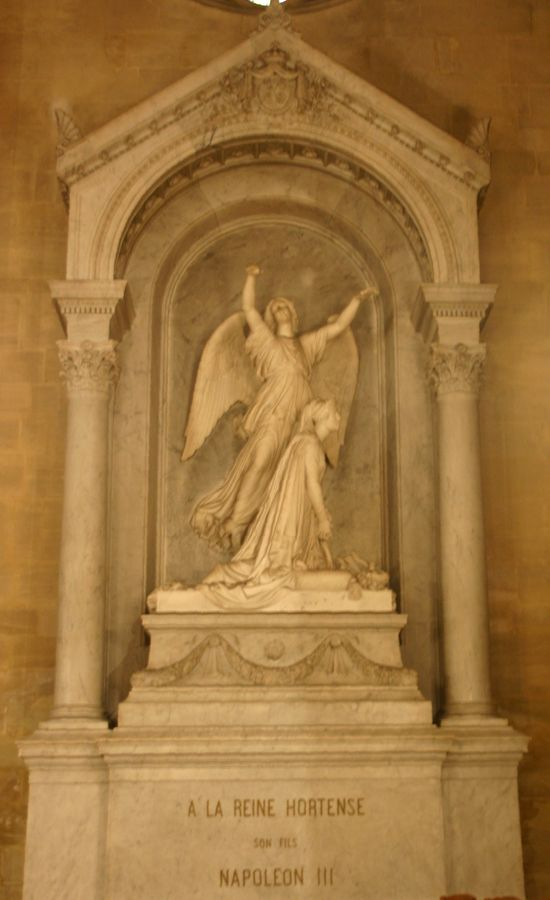
Tombeau d'Hortense, Church of Saint Pierre Saint Paul in Rueil-Malmaison.

== Bibliography ==
- Davenport's 2001-02 Art Reference & Price Guide
- 1999 Benezit, Vol. 1
- Berman's Bronzes, Vol. 2
- Web site of the Louvre
