= Cinderella stamp =

Stamp not issued for postal purposes

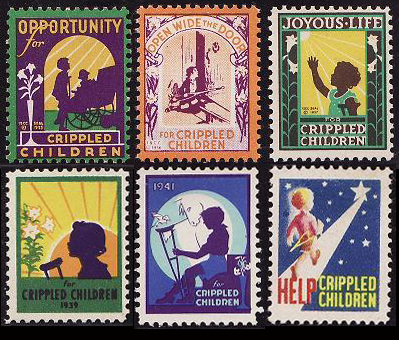
American Easter seals from the 1930s

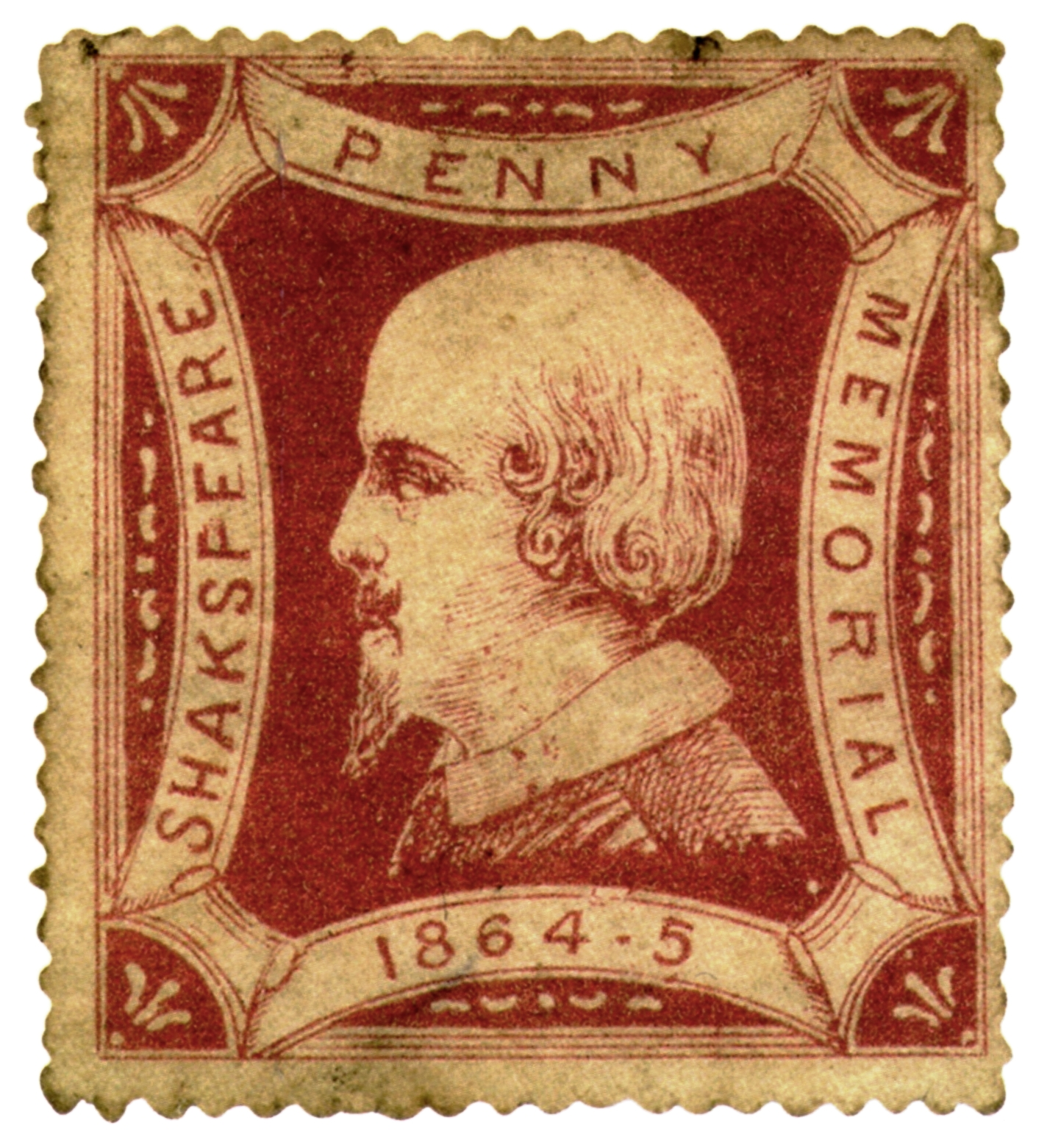
The 1864 Shakespeare Penny Memorial poster stamp

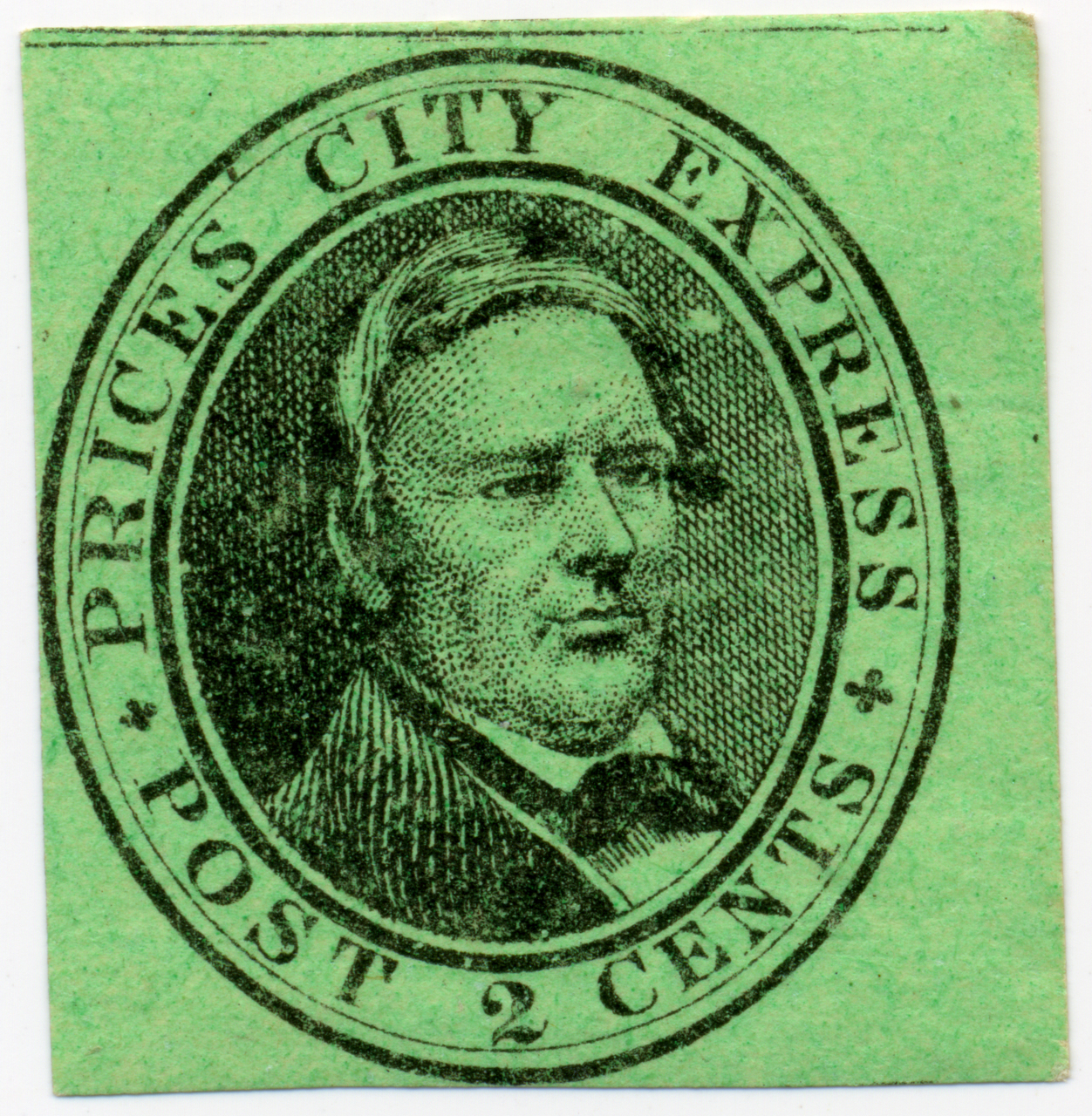
A U.S. local stamp for Price's City Express, from about 1858. Local stamps are considered cinderella stamps.

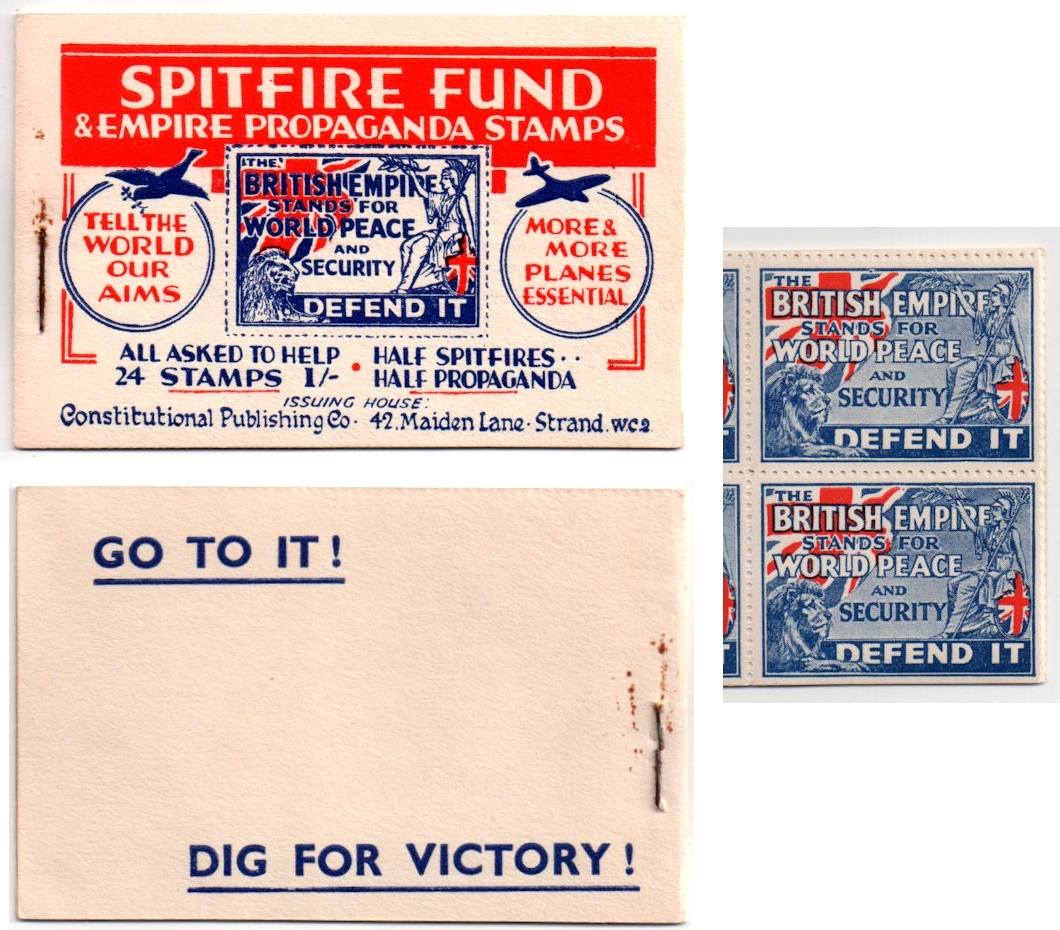
Allied propaganda stamps for the World War II Spitfire Fund and its accompanying booklet

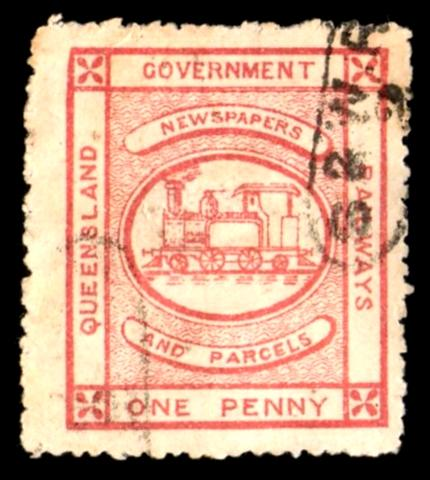
A used railway stamp from Queensland, Australia, for 1 penny valid for the transport of newspapers and parcels.

In philately, a cinderella stamp is a label that resembles a postage stamp, but which is not issued for postal purposes by a government administration. There is a wide variety of cinderella stamps, such as those printed for promotional use by businesses, churches, or political or non-profit groups. The term excludes imprinted stamps on postal stationery.

== Etymology ==
Named after Cinderella, a folk-tale underdog heroine who was treated as inferior within her family. Cinderella stamps similarly were considered inferior to postage stamps.

== Types ==
As cinderella stamps are defined by what they are not, there are many different types and the term is usually construed fairly loosely. Items normally regarded as falling within the area are poster stamps, propaganda labels, commemorative stickers, stamps issued by non-recognised countries or governments, charity labels like Christmas seals and Easter seals, most telegraph stamps, some railway stamps, some local stamps and purely decorative items created for advertising or amusement.

Revenue stamps may be considered cinderellas, but as they are normally issued by an official government agency, they tend to be classified separately. Some telegraph, railway and other stamps may also be issued by government agencies but still fall under the cinderella umbrella since they are not for postal purposes.

=== Local stamps ===
Local stamps have a long history and began to be issued soon after the invention of the postage stamp. Zemstvo stamps were issued in rural areas of the Russian Empire (c. 1860–1917), and local stamps have been issued in many other countries. Many local stamps, such as hotel stamps, performed a genuine postal function where the national post was lacking. Other locals, however, amount to nothing more than colourful labels.

In the United Kingdom many local carriage labels have been issued by offshore islands, which in some cases had a genuine use to pay for transport of the mail to the mainland by ferry. Others were produced simply to sell to collectors and tourists. Usually they had to be placed on the back of the envelope, with a conventional stamp on the front to pay for onward delivery by the official postal service. Islands for which such labels have been issued include the Summer Isles, Lundy, Eynhallow, and the Calf of Man.

=== Political and propaganda stamps ===
While it is common to find patriotic sentiments on official stamps, the term propaganda stamp is usually used to mean unofficial stamps produced to promote a particular ideology, or to create confusion within an enemy state. Stamps with encouraging slogans have been attached to letters for prisoners of war, or troops serving abroad.

Sometimes stamps are issued by breakaway governments, governments in exile, or micronations in order to give themselves greater legitimacy; however, these stamps usually have no postal validity and are therefore cinderella items. The Indian National Army (Azad Hind) produced ten stamps as part of their campaign.

From 1951 to 1966, UNESCO issued a series of 41 "gift stamps". Considered to be cinderellas, they were produced to raise money for the organization. The series is unusual in being an international cooperative effort. Most are readily available from specialized dealers.

Illustrator and anarchist Clifford Harper, whose family had an occupational history in the postal service, designed stamps "for post-revolutionary post" bearing the image of anarchist figures such as Pierre-Joseph Proudhon ("property is theft"), Oscar Wilde, Emma Goldman and Emiliano Zapata. Colin Ward, along with Harper, published a book in 1997 called Stamps: Designs For Anarchist Postage Stamps, containing an essay by Ward on the subject of anarchists and postage stamps. Fund-raising stamps with anti-state messages have appeared within labor unions such as the ones printed by the Confederación Nacional del Trabajo, and the Industrial Workers of the World.

The Jewish National Fund had been publishing its own stamps since 1901, promoting the ideology of Zionism.

=== Non-official railway stamps ===
In the United Kingdom, the railway letter service, a special facility offered by most British railway companies since 1891, produced a great variety of stamps and labels, which were originally an official requirement of the service. Current officially licensed Heritage railway-operated services include the Festiniog Railway Letter Service. United Kingdom railway letter stamps almost always specify a fee (often, even in Victorian times, priced higher than the current postage fee, which additionally had to be paid with regular postage stamps) for the use of this official and once-important British postal facility.

== Design ==
The design of cinderella items generally follows the principles of postage stamp design, but they may lack a country name, often replaced by the organization or cause being promoted, or a denomination. Sometimes a fictitious country or denomination may be present.

== Collecting ==
While many cinderella stamps are common, others were privately produced in limited numbers, are little-known, and can be quite rare. Cinderella stamps are not normally listed in the main stamp-collecting catalogues; if they are, it is usually in a separate appendix within the publication, and so they are sometimes called back of the book stamps. Online catalogues include cinderella stamps and usually have them listed as one of the emission types.

Revenue stamps are a recognised competitive category within the FIP (Fédération Internationale de Philatélie) and have their own commissioner, unlike other types of cinderella stamps.

There are cinderella stamp clubs in the United Kingdom and in Australia, both of which accept members worldwide. Cinderella philately has a specific name in many countries, such as Erinnophilie in France and Germany, or Erinnofilia in Italy.

== See also ==
- Artistamp
- Illegal stamps
- Cinderella Stamp Club
- Exonumia
