= Jacques-Jean Barre =

French engraver

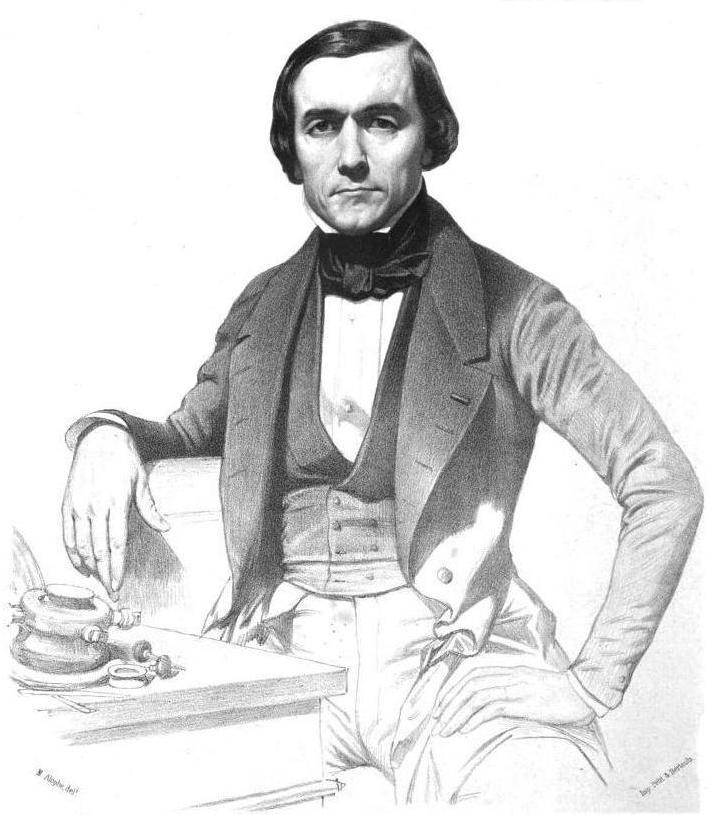
Portrait of Jacques-Jean Barre, from Album du Salon de 1840 by Jean Baptiste Marius Augustin Challamel, Paris, 1840

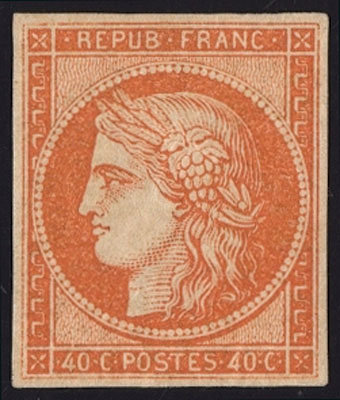
Ceres series designed by Jacques-Jean Barre / 1849 1850 / 3e stamp of France

Jacques-Jean Barre (3 August 1793 – 10 June 1855) was the 17th chief coin engraver (graveur général) at the Monnaie de Paris between 1842 and 1855. In this position, he engraved and designed French medals, the Great Seal of France, bank notes and postage stamps, as well as the first Swiss coinage which was initially minted there.

From the late 1840s until 1855, he created the first two French postage stamp designs: the Ceres series and Napoleon III series.

His two sons, artists themselves, succeeded him at the post of general engraver:

- Albert Désiré Barre
- and Jean-Auguste Barre (for only one year).
