= Easterseals (U.S.) =

Non-profit organization

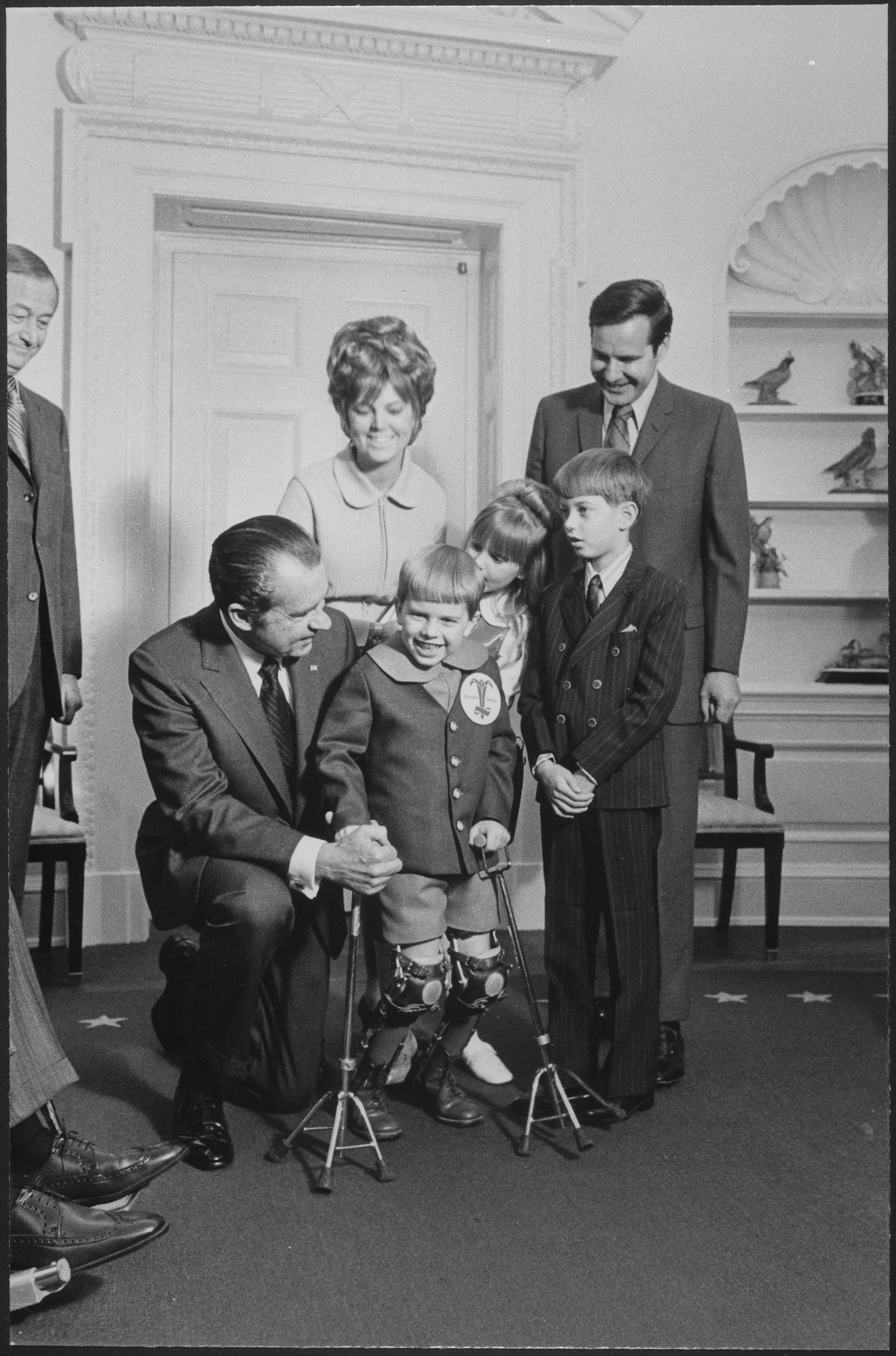
President Nixon with Peter Helteme, 1971 Easter Seal Child and family

Easterseals (formerly known as Easter Seals; founded in 1919 as the National Society for Crippled Children) is an American 501(c)(3) nonprofit providing disability services, with additional support areas serving veterans and military families, seniors, and caregivers.

== Services ==
Easterseals has a network of locations across the United States. Services assist people with physical disabilities, mental disabilities, and special needs. Parents can find support for a child who has a diagnosis at birth and there are services for people who have a disability due to disease, injury, or aging.

Easterseals' offerings are categorized into support areas:

- Enhancing health – helping individuals and families to achieve life goals through autism services, rehabilitation services, mental health support and housing.
- Enriching education – helping children and adults gain skills to live a fulfilled life through assistive technology, child care and early intervention services.
- Expanding employment – helping people with disabilities, older workers, and veterans prepare for employment.
- Elevating community – providing fun activities for adults and children to build community, relax and rejuvenate through camp and recreation programs.

== Fundraising ==
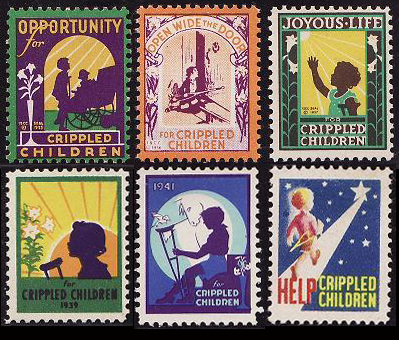
American Easter Seals from the 1930s

90% of funds raised go to Easterseals disability services across the nation. Easterseals' funding sources include government grants and agency programs, donations, and fee-for-service initiatives. Donations help the organization provide affordable offerings to clients while maintaining program costs. Easterseals serves about 1.3 million individuals per year.

The name "Easter Seals" derived from an earlier fundraising program: beginning in 1934, colorful adhesive seals, the size of postage stamps, were sold around Easter; purchasers stuck these on the back of mailed envelopes, as a popular tradition was to send cards to friends and family both at Christmas and Easter seasons. Because of the program's success, the organization changed its name from "the National Society for Crippled Children" to "Easter Seals". It has since changed its name to "Easterseals".

In 2003, Easterseals started "Walk With Me" events across the country. Thousands of people have attended these events over the years, generating millions of dollars for disability services.

In 2010, Easterseals expanded the "seal" program through introducing the "Easterseals Blanket". The image on the blanket is chosen through an online vote for the Lily Seal of the Year. Artists submit depictions of lilies to be featured on the blanket.

== Legislative action ==
Since the 1920s, Easterseals has worked with federal, state, and local officials to advance legislation for people with disabilities and disability services. This includes the Americans with Disabilities Act (ADA). Passed in 1990, the ADA guarantees the civil rights of people with disabilities and prohibits discrimination.

Easterseals also created a public service campaign that highlighted accessibility and employment issues to be addressed by the ADA's implementation.

Today, Easterseals continues to advocate for policies that support people with disabilities.

== Structure ==
=== Headquarters ===
Easterseals' national office, located in the Board of Trade Building in Chicago, provides assistance to several affiliates through management training, implementation of best practices, consultation services, fundraising, marketing, advocacy, and corporate relations.

=== Affiliates and service sites ===
Nationwide, Easterseals locations provide services to people with disabilities and special needs in their local communities. Each location operates independently as its own 501(c)(3) corporation under the Easterseals name.

=== Board of Directors and House of Delegates ===
Easterseals is governed by a National Board of Directors, which is composed of volunteers, most of whom are nominated by one of the organization's affiliates across the country. Elections to the Board, composed of between 15 and 19 members, are held annually by another larger volunteer body, Easterseals National House of Delegates. Directors are elected for three-year terms, and terms are staggered to achieve strength and continuity on the board.

Easterseals National House of Delegates consists of volunteers certified by their affiliates to represent them as delegates at the organization's annual convention, thus ensuring broad representation of Easterseals affiliates nationwide. In addition to the numerous training and motivational sessions offered to Easterseals board members, delegates and affiliate staff throughout the convention, the Annual Meeting of the House takes place, when the house elects new members to the national board and addresses any other motions put before it.

In March 2020, Easterseals announced the addition of Glenn Henderson, entrepreneur and motivational speaker, and Barry Simon, President and CEO at Easterseals of Oak Hill (CT), to its National Board of Directors.

== See also ==
- Easter seals (philately), issued to raise funds for charitable purposes in the United States and Canada
- Ticket to Work, SSA's Ticket to Work Program
