= Poster stamp =

Advertising label

The poster stamp was an advertising label, a little larger than most postage stamps, which originated in the mid-19th century and quickly became a collecting craze, growing in popularity until World War I and then declining by World War II, until they were almost forgotten, except by collectors of cinderella stamps.

== Definitions ==
The term "poster stamp" is as its name suggests a stamp imprinted with the design of a poster that won an award in a poster contest. The City of Newark, New Jersey, for example, for the celebration of the 250th Anniversary of the City 1666–1916 had a Committee of the One Hundred organize in 1915 a poster contest inviting ten internationally known poster artists to compete against any other artist in the public forum who wished to enter the contest. The 1st prize won by Adolph Treidler with the poster No. 56 Robert Treat directing the landing of the Founders of Newark, the 2nd prize, by Helen Dryden, poster No. 19, and 3rd place poster No. 24, by A. E. Foringer became just such poster stamps that were manufactured by the Newark Lithograph Company.

The unofficial nature of poster stamps has led to debate about exactly what is and is not a poster stamp. One definition has been "labels without postage stamp values, not good for postal service; advertising labels or charity labels."

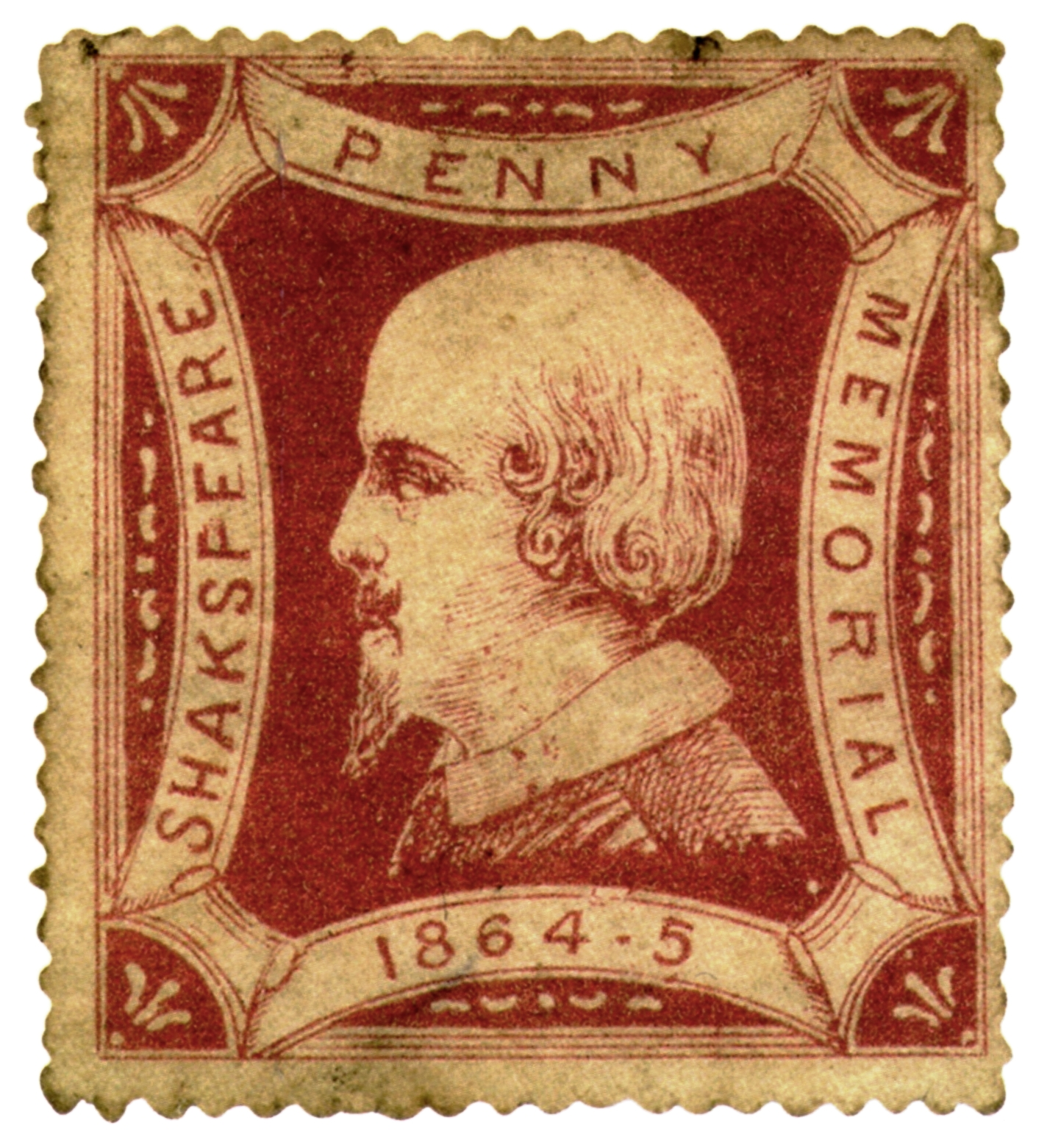
The 1864 Shakespeare Penny Memorial poster stamp

== Origins ==
The first poster stamps were inspired by the invention of the postage stamp. A perforated label was produced in England in 1864 to celebrate the 300th anniversary of Shakespeare's birth and in Italy a label was produced in 1860 to celebrate Garibaldi's expedition to Sicily during the campaign to unify Italy. Commercial interests soon realised the publicity potential of the stamps and they were quickly adopted for the promotion of every type of product and cause.

Poster stamps were also widely used by both sides during World War One as political propaganda. Fascism in Italy (1922-1943) used poster stamps, and sometimes regular stamps, to increase the popularity of italian mass flights: Crociera Aviatoria del Mediterraneo Orientale 1929; Crociera Aerea Italia-Brasile 1930; and Crociera Aerea del Decennale 1933.

== Scope ==
As late as the 1930s they were still being used to promote political and other causes. In 1937, Irene Harand published a series of anti-Nazi poster stamps portraying the contributions made by Jews to civilisation over the centuries.

Adhesive labels of all kinds that are not postage stamps continue to be produced today to promote particular causes or events.

== Vintage method revival ==
In 2017, two designers of Plazm (magazine) launched The Portland Stamp Company to revive the poster stamp tradition using vintage perforation equipment. Their revival stamps were featured in the monthly subscription service Mail More Love, pictured in Oprah magazine.

== See also ==
- Campbell-Johnston Collection
- Cinderella stamp
- Cinderella Stamp Club
