= Printer's sample stamp =

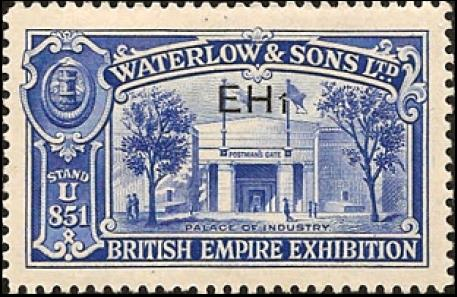
A 1925 sample stamp from Waterlow & Sons Limited produced for the British Empire Exhibition.

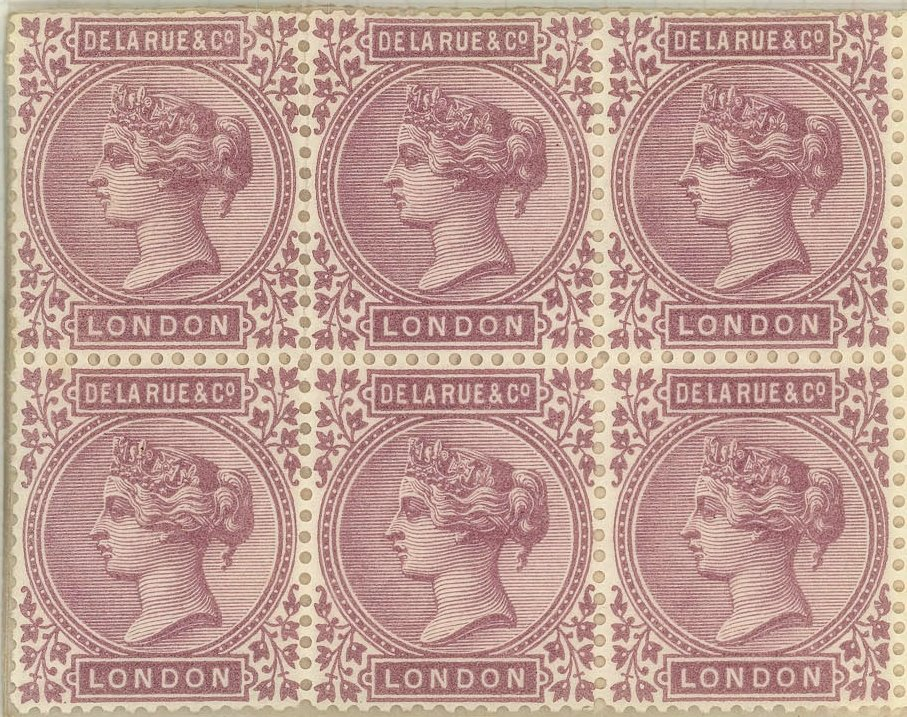
Sample stamps from De La Rue produced c. 1884 in connection with a proposal for stamp booklets.

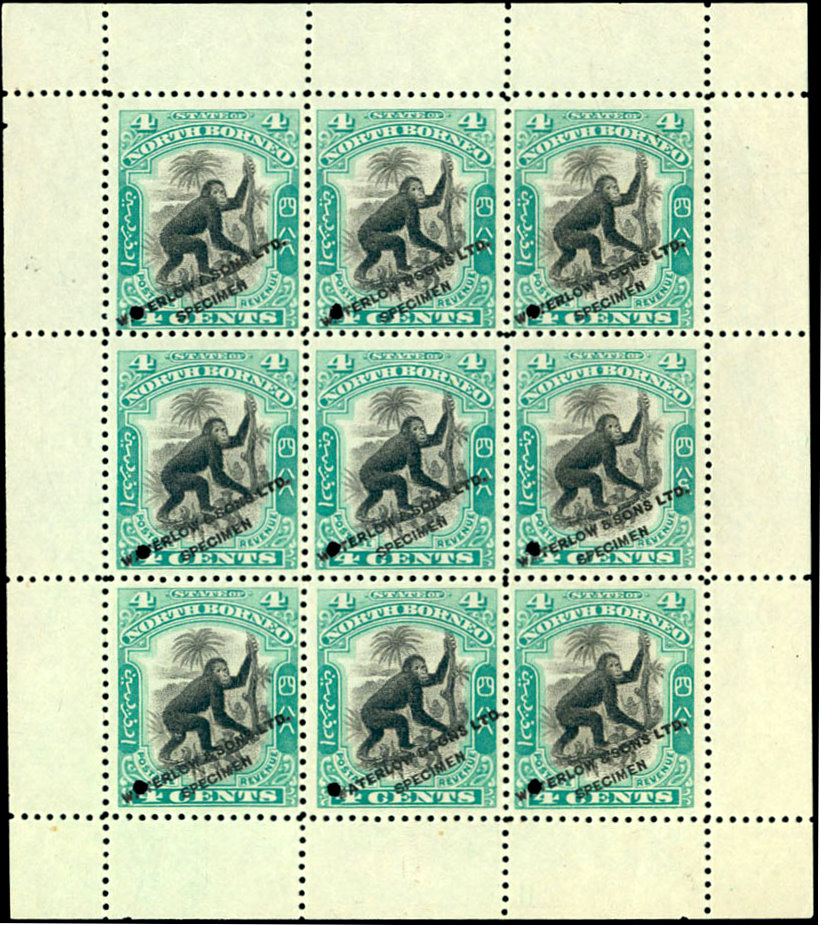
Waterlow sample stamps for North Borneo from the 1897-1902 issue in the typical format of a small sheetlet of 3 x 3.

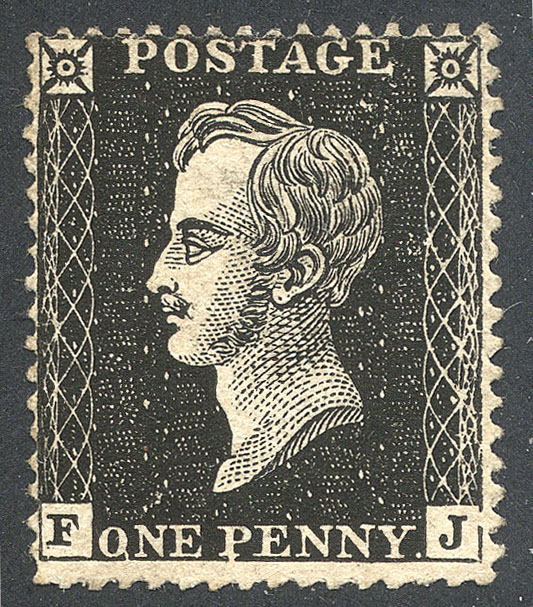
The Prince Consort Essay in black.

A printer's sample stamp is a label produced by a printer resembling a postage stamp, but with no postal or other validity. Often it will include the name of the printer and demonstrate their printing capabilities. The stamps are not intended for use and are therefore to be distinguished from test stamps, though both test stamps and printer's sample stamps are dummy stamps in the broadest sense of that term.

== De La Rue ==
The R.M. Phillips Collection at the British Postal Museum and Archive contains a number of sample stamps produced by De La Rue before 1900, bearing their name and demonstrating their printing abilities for the British Post Office.

== Waterlow & Sons ==
Waterlow & Sons produced many small sheetlets of sample stamps in the same design as genuine stamps produced for their customers, but with the colours changed and overprinted diagonally "Waterlow & Sons Ltd. Specimen". The stamps in these sheetlets were also punched with a small hole in the corner to prevent their postal or revenue use and the sheetlets were displayed at the 1910 Brussels Exhibition. Clive Akerman comments in The Presentation of Revenue Stamps: Taxes and Duties in South America, that the stamps were produced from obsolete dies.

== The Prince Consort Essay ==
The Prince Consort Essay was a printer's sample stamp created in 1851 as an example of the surface printed stamps that Henry Archer proposed to print and perforate under contract with the British government at a lower price than the current printing firm of Perkins Bacon. The Prince Consort stamps were provided by the artist Robert Edward Branston, from an engraving executed by Samuel William Reynolds.

Although commonly known as an essay, the stamp was not really an essay as it was never intended that a postage stamp be produced based on the design, nor was it an un-adopted design. It is more accurately described as a printer's sample stamp.

== Worldwide ==
The concept has been used worldwide with modern sample stamps from printers in Switzerland and the Netherlands, amongst other countries, commonly seen in philatelic circles.

== See also ==
- Cinderella stamps
- Specimen stamp
- Test stamp
- Training stamp
- Dummy stamp
