= Prince Consort Essay =

United Kingdom postage stamp

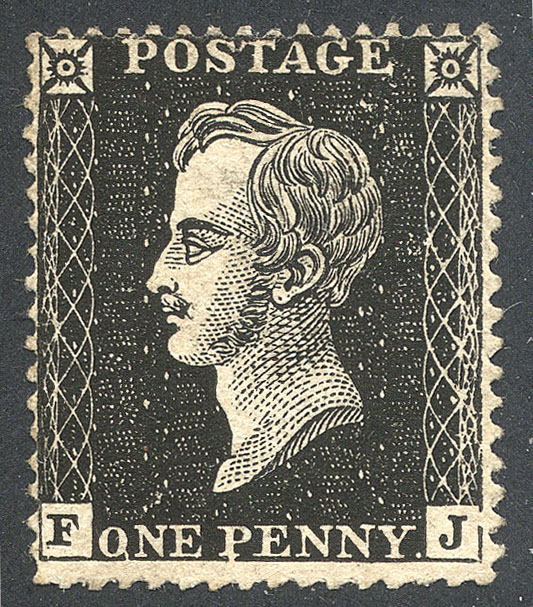
The Prince Consort Essay in black.

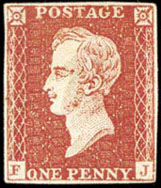
The Essay in red-brown.

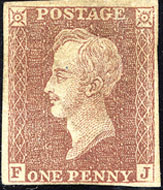
The Essay in brown.

The Prince Consort Essay was a surface printed printer's sample stamp created in 1851 as an example of the surface printed stamps that Henry Archer proposed to print and perforate under contract with the British government at a lower price than the current printing firm of Perkins Bacon. The Prince Consort stamps were provided by the artist Robert Edward Branston, from an engraving executed by Samuel William Reynolds.

Although commonly known as an essay, the stamp was not really an essay as it was never intended that a postage stamp be produced based on the design, nor was it an un-adopted design. It is more accurately described as a printer's sample stamp, or dummy stamp.

== Background ==
The first essay depicted Queen Victoria, but Edwin Hill cautioned Reynolds not to make any essays with the Queen's portrait. Therefore, Prince Albert's portrait was used instead. It is noted that the essays have the check letters "F" and "J" and it is believed by some scholars that they are the initials of Ferdinand Joubert, who designed Britain's first surface printed postage stamp, the 1855 Four Pence stamp printed by De La Rue, and who may have played a role in the creation of the Prince Consort Essay.

== Production ==
The Prince Consort Essay was printed from electros taken from one master plate of 12. The twelve positions all have unique characteristics. The essays were printed in red, red-brown, black and blue, in sheets of 36 (3 horizontal rows of 12), in sheets of 240 and in sheets of 252 (21 panes of 12). The essays are scarce and there are approximately 25 recorded examples perforated 16 by Archer. The majority are imperforate, and there is one rouletted example in the Royal Philatelic Collection.

== Collecting ==
Imperforate copies are available to collectors, typically for around several hundred pounds. There are approximately 36 perforated examples recorded and these sell for much higher prices. Of the 36 examples, 3 are in brown, three are in blue (the latest realized £38,080.00 at auction) and the remainder are in black.
