= Mlaka nad Lušo =

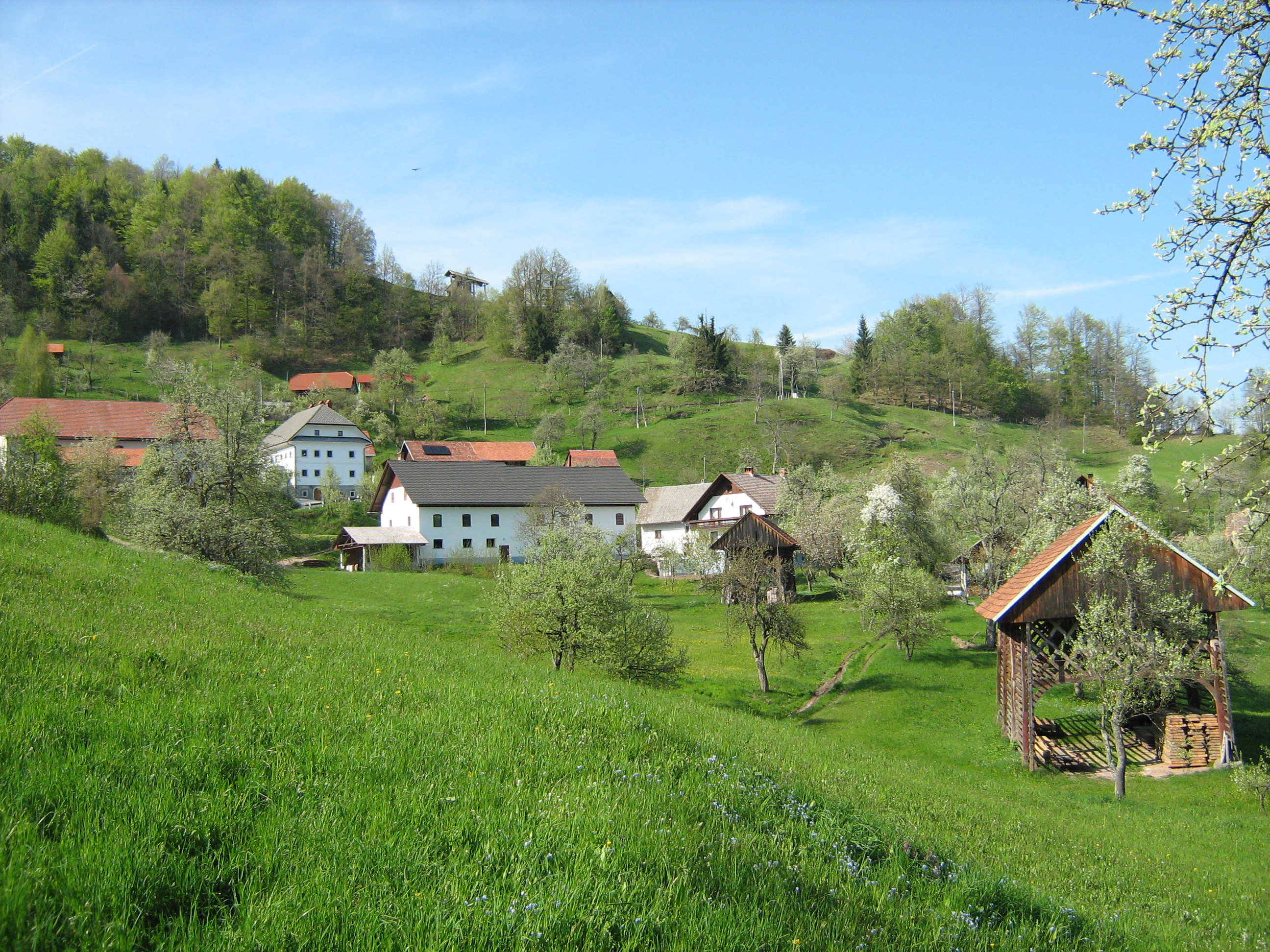

- Location in Slovenia
- Coordinates: 46°10′15.77″N 14°12′1.05″E
- Country: Slovenia
- Traditional region: Upper Carniola
- Statistical region: Upper Carniola
- Municipality: Gorenja Vas–Poljane

Area
  - Total: 1.79 km^{2} (0.69 sq mi)
- Elevation: 762 m (2,500 ft)

Population (2020)
  - Total: 37
  - Density: 21/km^{2} (54/sq mi)

Mlaka nad Lušo (pronounced [ˈmlaːka nad ˈluːʃɔ]) is a small settlement above Luša in the Municipality of Gorenja Vas–Poljane in the Upper Carniola region of Slovenia.

== Name ==
Mlaka nad Lušo was attested in historical sources as Lak in 1291, Mlakch in 1436, Mlaka in 1478, and Namlatzi in 1500, among other spellings. The name of the settlement was changed from Mlaka to Mlaka nad Lušo in 1955. The name Mlaka nad Lušo means 'Mlaka above Luša', referring to its position about 300 meters (980 ft) above the villages of Spodnja Luša and Zgornja Luša. The name Mlaka is derived from the Slovene common noun mlaka 'pond', referring to the village pond or another small body of standing water.
