= Seebeck =

Seebeck is a surname. Notable people with the surname include:

- August Seebeck (1805–1849), German scientist
- Nicholas F. Seebeck (1857–1899), German-American stamp printer
- Thomas Johann Seebeck (1770–1831), Baltic German physicist

== See also ==
- Seebeck effect, a form of thermoelectric effect
