= Training stamp =

Type of stamp used to train postal workers

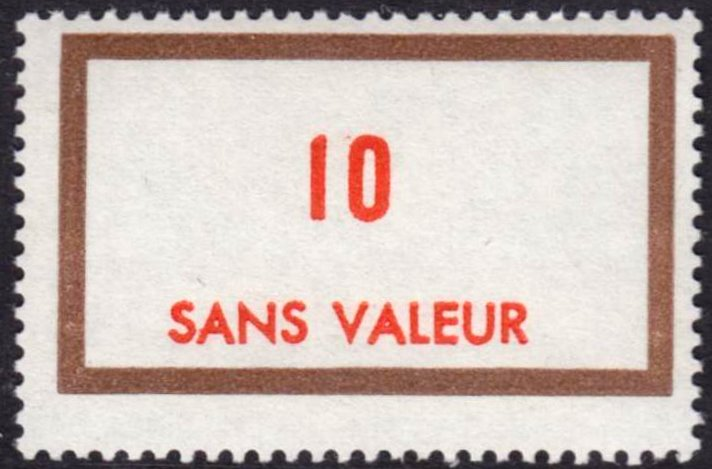
A modern French training stamp

A training stamp is a label resembling a postage stamp that is used by postal authorities to train postal workers. They generally have the same size and shape as regular stamps, but with a minimal design. Alternatively, several countries have simply obliterated their regular stamps in order to make the training process more realistic, for instance Sudan and the United Kingdom.

In some cases, training stamps may be interchangeable with test stamps though test stamps do not need to have a range of values to assist with training postal workers. Although training stamps are not normally available to the general public, some have found their way into private hands, and they are a recognised stamp collecting speciality. Training stamps are a form of cinderella stamp.

== France ==
Training stamps have been widely used in France and one series consists of a number of plain labels of minimal design with different numbers and the words sans valeur (without value).

== Sudan ==
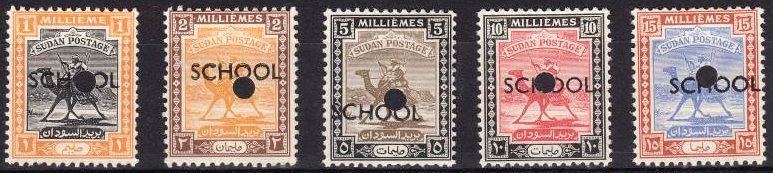
Post office training stamps of Sudan. Overprinted and punched to prevent postal use.

A number of Sudanese stamps have been overprinted "school" for use at the post office training school.

== United Kingdom ==
Stamps used for training postal workers in the United Kingdom are usually normal postage or other stamps, including television license and national insurance stamps (when they were in use), obliterated with two vertical or horizontal bars to prevent genuine use, though other forms of cancellation have been used such as overprinting or rubber stamps. They have frequently found their way into the hands of collectors. Early examples were properly printed with bars but more recent examples tend to simply be crossed through with a black marker pen. A range of cancelled or voided paper money, cheques, postal orders, credit cards and horizon labels are also used to train workers which takes place at counter training schools (CTOs). Before decimalisation in 1971, post offices were issued with very simple training stamps in the same colours as the upcoming decimal stamps.

=== Gallery of British training stamps ===
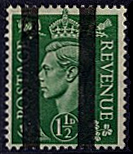
A British training stamp overprinted with vertical bars to prevent genuine postal use

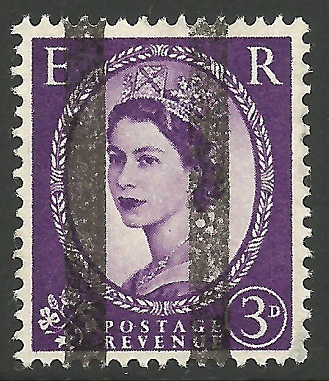
A 3d Wilding series training stamp, 1954 or later

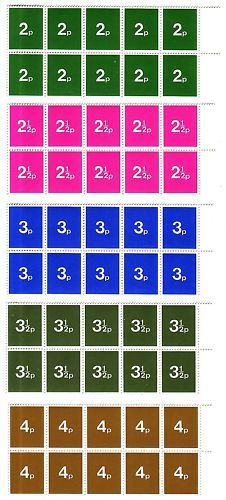
British decimalisation training stamps in the same colours and values as the upcoming decimal stamps

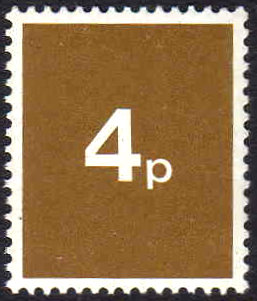
The 4p stamp from the decimalisation series. The stamps had no real postal value.

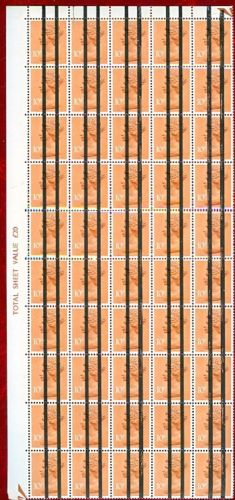
Part sheet of cancelled 10p Machin series stamps

== United States ==
Around the early twentieth century, some U.S. business colleges used specially pre-cancelled stamps or stamp-like labels to train students in the handling of stamps.

== See also ==
- Test stamp
- Dummy stamp
- Specimen stamp
- Printer's sample stamp
