= Red mercury (disambiguation) =

Red mercury is a hoax substance of uncertain composition purportedly used in the creation of nuclear bombs.

Red mercury may also refer to:

- Red Mercury (newspaper stamp), an Austrian postage stamp
- Red Mercury (film), a film produced in the United Kingdom, first released in 2005
- Cinnabar, the bright scarlet to brick-red form of mercury(II) sulfide

== See also ==
- Shadow Ops: Red Mercury, a video game
