= Postage stamp =

Piece of paper which shows payment for postage

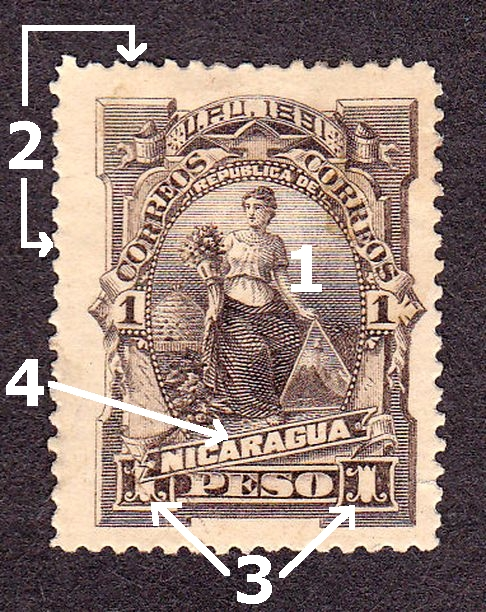
The main components of a stamp: 1. Image; 2. Perforations; 3. Denomination; 4. Country name

A postage stamp is a small piece of paper issued by a post office, postal administration, or other authorized vendors to customers who pay postage (the cost involved in moving, insuring, or registering mail). Then the stamp is affixed to the face or address-side of any item of mail—an envelope or other postal cover (e.g., packet, box, mailing cylinder)—which they wish to send. The item is then processed by the postal system, where a postmark or cancellation mark—in modern usage indicating date and point of origin of mailing—is applied to the stamp and its left and right sides to prevent its reuse. Next the item is delivered to its address.

Always featuring the name of the issuing nation (with the exception of the United Kingdom), a denomination of its value, and often an illustration of persons, events, institutions, or natural realities that symbolize the nation's traditions and values, every stamp is printed on a piece of usually rectangular, but sometimes triangular or otherwise shaped special custom-made paper whose back is either glazed with an adhesive gum or self-adhesive.

Because governments issue stamps of different denominations in unequal numbers and routinely discontinue some lines and introduce others, and because of their illustrations and association with the social and political realities of the time of their issue, they are often prized for their beauty and historical significance by stamp collectors, whose study of their history and of mailing systems is called philately. Because collectors often buy stamps from an issuing agency with no intention to use them for postage, the revenues from such purchases and payments of postage can make them a source of net profit to that agency. On 1 May 1840, Sir Rowland Hill invented the Penny Black, the first adhesive postage stamp issued in the United Kingdom, selecting a simple design that showed Queen Victoria's profile. The artist Henry Corbould drew her image, basing his work on a medal by William Wyon. Perkins, Bacon & Petch, a leading security printing firm printed the stamp. Within three years postage stamps were introduced in Switzerland and Brazil, a little later in the United States, and by 1860, they were in 90 countries around the world. The first postage stamps did not need to show the issuing country, so no country name was included on them. Thus the United Kingdom remains the only country in the world to omit its name on postage stamps; the monarch's image signifies the United Kingdom as the country of origin.

== Invention ==
Throughout modern history numerous methods were used to indicate that postage had been paid on a mailed item, so several different men have received credit for inventing the postage stamp.

=== William Dockwra ===
In April 1680, William Dockwra, an English searcher at the customs-house in London, and his partner Robert Murray established the London Penny Post. The LPP was a mail system that delivered letters and small parcels up to a pound in weight and £10 in value inside the city of London for the sum of one penny. Confirmation of paid postage was indicated by the use of a hand stamp to frank the mailed item. Though this "stamp" was applied to the letter or parcel itself, rather than to a separate piece of paper, it is considered by many historians to be the world's first postage stamp.

=== Lovrenc Košir ===
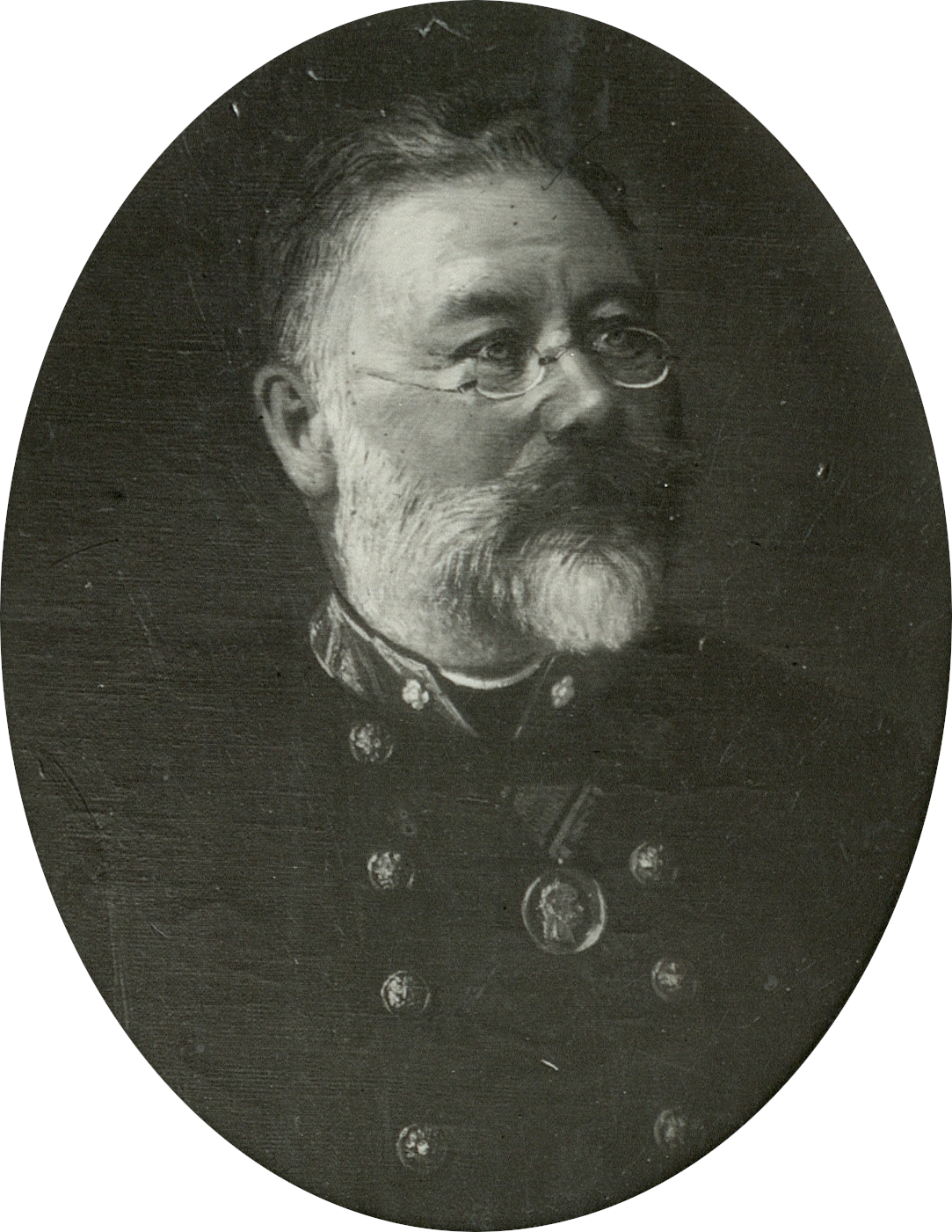
Lovrenc Košir, 1870s

In 1835, the civil servant Lovrenc Košir from Ljubljana in Austria-Hungary (now Slovenia), suggested the use of "artificially affixed postal tax stamps" using "gepresste Papieroblate" ("pressed paper wafers"), but although civil bureaucrats considered the suggestion in detail, it was not adopted. The 'Papieroblate' were to produce stamps as paper decals so thin as to prevent their reuse.

=== Rowland Hill ===
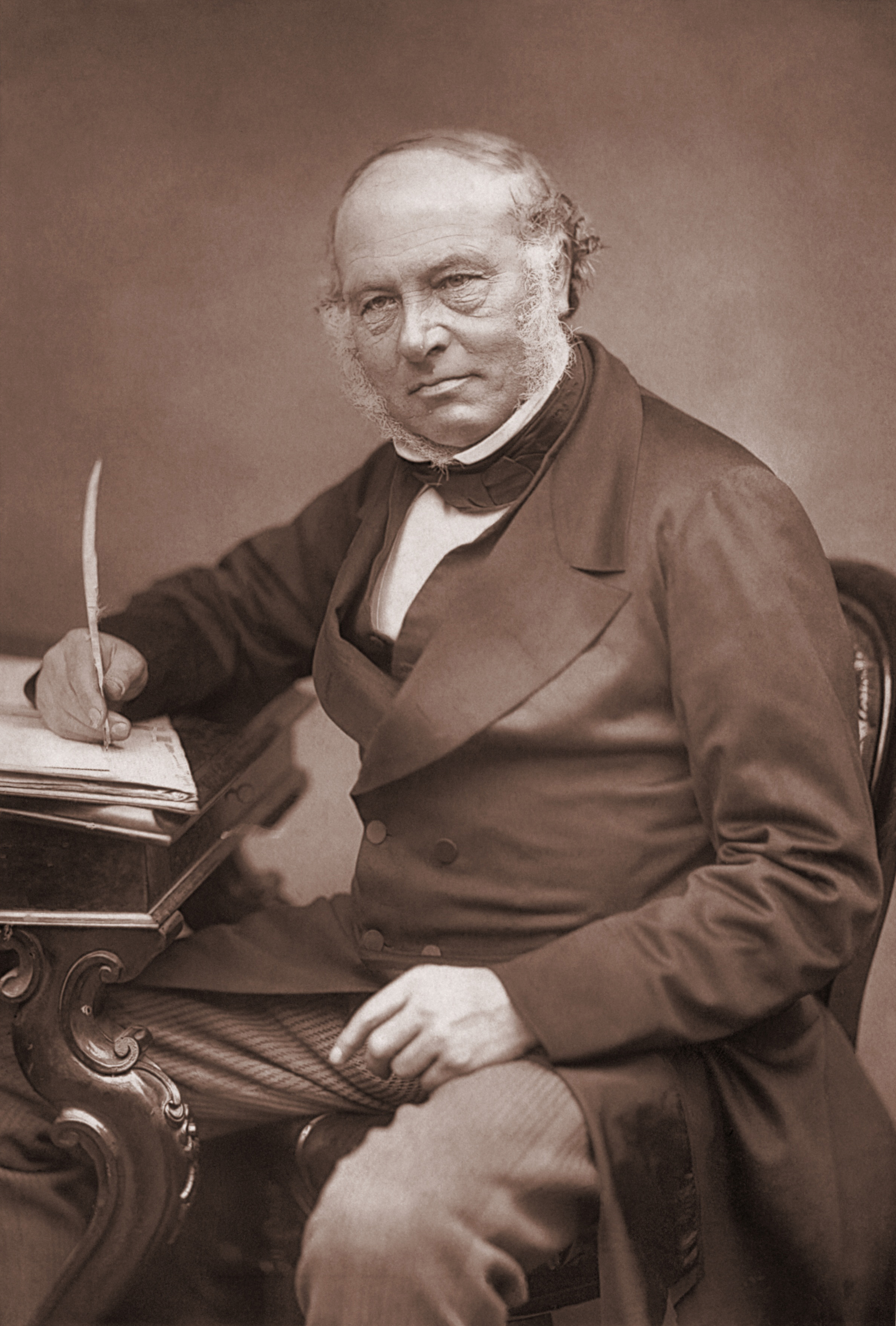
Rowland Hill

In 1836, Robert Wallace, a Member of (British) Parliament, gave Sir Rowland Hill numerous books and documents about the postal service, which Hill described as a "half hundred weight of material". After a detailed study, on 4 January 1837 Hill submitted a pamphlet entitled Post Office Reform: Its Importance and Practicability to the Chancellor of the Exchequer, Thomas Spring Rice, which was marked "private and confidential", and not released to the general public. The Chancellor summoned Hill to a meeting at which he suggested improvements and changes to be presented in a supplement, which Hill duly produced and submitted on 28 January 1837. Hill wrote Post Office Reform while he served as secretary of the South Australian Colonization Commission. The colonization of South Australia roughly followed Edward Gibbon Wakefield's scheme of colonization which emphasized the uniform pricing of land, and Wakefield's ideas influenced Hill's argument for the uniform pricing of postal rates.

Summoned to give evidence before the Commission for Post Office Enquiry on 13 February 1837, Hill read from the letter he wrote to the Chancellor that included a statement saying that the notation of paid postage could be created... "by using a bit of paper just large enough to bear the stamp, and covered at the back with a glutinous wash..." This would eventually become the first unambiguous description of a modern adhesive postage stamp (though the term "postage stamp" originated at a later date). Shortly afterward, Hill's revision of the booklet, dated 22 February 1837, containing some 28,000 words, incorporating the supplement given to the Chancellor and statements he made to the commission, was published and made available to the general public. Hansard records that on 15 December 1837, Benjamin Hawes asked the Chancellor of the Exchequer "whether it was the intention of the Government to give effect to the recommendation of the Commissioners of the Post-office, contained in their ninth report relating to the reduction of the rates of postage, and the issuing of penny stamps?"

Hill's ideas for postage stamps and charging paid-postage based on weight soon took hold, and were adopted in many countries throughout the world. With the new policy of charging by weight, using envelopes for mailing documents became the norm. Hill's brother Edwin invented a prototype envelope-making machine that folded paper into envelopes quickly enough to match the pace of the growing demand for postage stamps.

Rowland Hill and the reforms he introduced to the United Kingdom postal system appear on several of its commemorative stamps.

=== James Chalmers ===
In the 1881 book The Penny Postage Scheme of 1837, Scotsman Patrick Chalmers claimed that his father, James Chalmers, published an essay in August 1834 describing and advocating a postage stamp, but submitted no evidence of the essay's existence. Nevertheless, until he died in 1891, Patrick Chalmers campaigned to have his father recognized as the inventor of the postage stamp.

The first independent evidence for Chalmers' claim is an essay, dated 8 February 1838 and received by the Post Office on 17 February 1838, in which he proposed adhesive postage stamps to the General Post Office. In this approximately 800-word document concerning methods of indicating that postage had been paid on mail he states:

Therefore, of Mr Hill's plan of a uniform rate of postage... I conceive that the most simple and economical mode... would be by Slips... in the hope that Mr Hill's plan may soon be carried into operation I would suggest that sheets of Stamped Slips should be prepared... then be rubbed over on the back with a strong solution of gum...

Chalmers' original document is now in the United Kingdom's National Postal Museum.

Since Chalmers used the same postage denominations that Hill had proposed in February 1837, it is clear that he was aware of Hill's proposals, but whether he obtained a copy of Hill's booklet or simply read about it in one or both of the two detailed accounts (25 March 1837 and 20 December 1837) published in The Times is unknown. Neither article mentioned "a bit of paper just large enough to bear the stamp", so Chalmers could not have known that Hill had made such a proposal. This suggests that either Chalmers had previously read Hill's booklet and was merely elaborating Hill's idea, or he had independently developed the idea of the modern postage stamp.

James Chalmers organized petitions "for a low and uniform rate of postage". The first such petition was presented in the House of Commons on 4 December 1837 (from Montrose). Further petitions which he organized were presented on 1 May 1838 (from Dunbar and Cupar), 14 May 1838 (from the county of Forfar), and 12 June 1839. At this same time, other groups organized petitions and presented them to Parliament. All petitions for consumer-oriented, low-cost, volume-based postal rates followed publication of Hill's proposals.

=== Other claimants ===
Other claimants include or have included

- Ferdinand Egarter of Spittal, Austria
- Samuel Forrester, a Scottish tax official
- John Gray of the British Museum
- Samuel Roberts of Llanbrynmair, Wales
- Francis Worrell Stevens, schoolmaster at Loughton
- Curry Gabriel Treffenberg from Sweden
- Charles Whiting, a London stationer

== History ==
=== The nineteenth century ===
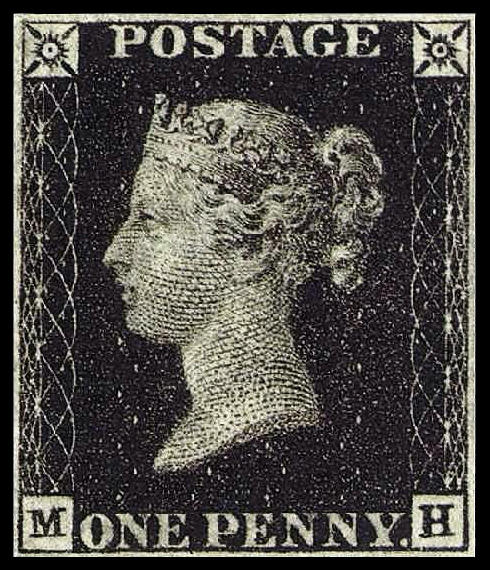
The Penny Black, the world's first postage stamp (1 May 1840)

Postage stamps have facilitated the delivery of mail since the 1840s. Before then, ink and hand-stamps (hence the word 'stamp'), usually made from wood or cork, were often used to frank the mail and confirm the payment of postage. The first adhesive postage stamp, commonly referred to as the Penny Black, was issued in the United Kingdom in 1840. The invention of the stamp was part of an attempt to improve the postal system in the United Kingdom of Great Britain and Ireland, which, in the early 19th century, was in disarray and rife with corruption. There are varying accounts of the inventor or inventors of the stamp.

Before the introduction of postage stamps, mail in the United Kingdom was paid for by the recipient, a system that was associated with an irresolvable problem: the costs of delivering mail were not recoverable by the postal service when recipients were unable or unwilling to pay for delivered items, and senders had no incentive to restrict the number, size, or weight of items sent, whether or not they would ultimately be paid for. The postage stamp resolved this issue in a simple and elegant manner, with the additional benefit of room for an element of beauty to be introduced. Concurrently with the first stamps, the United Kingdom offered wrappers for mail. Later related inventions include postal stationery such as prepaid-postage envelopes, post cards, lettercards, aerogrammes, and postage meters.

The postage stamp afforded convenience for both the mailer and postal officials, more effectively recovered costs for the postal service, and ultimately resulted in a better, faster postal system. With the conveniences stamps offered, their use resulted in greatly increased mailings during the 19th and 20th centuries. Postage stamps released during this era were the most popular way of paying for mail; however by the end of the 20th century were rapidly being eclipsed by the use of metered postage and bulk mailing by businesses.

As postage stamps with their engraved imagery began to appear on a widespread basis, historians and collectors began to take notice. The study of postage stamps and their use is referred to as philately. Stamp collecting can be both a hobby and a form of historical study and reference, as government-issued postage stamps and their mailing systems have always been involved with the history of nations.

Although a number of people laid claim to the concept of the postage stamp, it is well documented that stamps were first introduced in the United Kingdom of Great Britain and Ireland on 1 May 1840 as a part of postal reforms promoted by Sir Rowland Hill. With its introduction the postage fee was paid by the sender and not the recipient, though it was still possible to send mail without prepaying. From when the first postage stamps were used, postmarks were applied to prevent the stamps being used again.

The first stamp, the "Penny Black", became available for purchase 1 May 1840, to be valid as of 6 May 1840. Two days later, 8 May 1840, the Two Penny Blue was introduced. The Penny Black was sufficient for a letter less than half an ounce to be sent anywhere within the United Kingdom. Both stamps included an engraving of the young Queen Victoria, without perforations, as the first stamps were separated from their sheets by cutting them with scissors.

The first stamps did not need to show the issuing country, so no country name was included on them. The United Kingdom remains the only country to omit its name on postage stamps, using the reigning monarch's head as country identification. Following the introduction of the postage stamp in the United Kingdom, prepaid postage considerably increased the number of letters mailed. Before 1839, the number of letters sent in the United Kingdom was typically 76 million. By 1850, this increased five-fold to 350 million, continuing to grow rapidly until the end of the 20th century when newer methods of indicating the payment of postage reduced the use of stamps.

Other countries soon followed the United Kingdom with their own stamps. The canton of Zürich in Switzerland issued the Zürich 4 and 6 rappen on 1 March 1843. Although the Penny black could be used to send a letter less than half an ounce anywhere within the United Kingdom, the Swiss did not initially adopt that system, instead continuing to calculate mail rates based on distance to be delivered. Brazil issued the Bull's Eye stamp on 1 August 1843. Using the same printer used for the Penny Black, Brazil opted for an abstract design instead of the portrait of Emperor Pedro II, so his image would not be disfigured by a postmark.

In 1845, some postmasters in the United States issued their own stamps, but it was not until 1847 that the first official United States stamps were issued: 5 and 10 cent issues depicting Benjamin Franklin and George Washington. A few other countries issued stamps in the late 1840s. The famous Mauritius "Post Office" stamps were issued by Mauritius in September 1847. Many others, such as India, started their use in the 1850s, and by the 1860s most countries issued stamps.

Perforation of postage stamps began in January 1854. The first officially perforated stamps were issued in February 1854. Stamps from Henry Archer's perforation trials were issued in the last few months of 1850; during the 1851 parliamentary session at the House of Commons of the United Kingdom; and finally in 1853/54 after the United Kingdom government paid Archer £4,000 for his machine and the patent.

The Universal Postal Union, established in 1874, prescribed that nations shall only issue postage stamps according to the quantity of real use, and no living persons shall be taken as subjects. The latter rule lost its significance after World War I.

=== The twentieth and twenty-first centuries ===
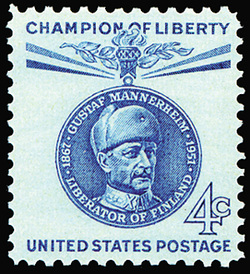
The US Mail postage stamp of Marshal C. G. E. Mannerheim from 1961

After World War II, it became customary in some countries, especially small Arab nations, to issue postage stamps en masse as it was realized how profitable that was.

During the 21st century, the amount of mail—and the use of postage stamps, accordingly—has reduced in the world because of electronic mail and other technological innovations. In 2013 the Netherlands PostNL introduced Postzegelcodes, a nine-character alphanumeric code that is written as a 3x3 grid on the piece of mail as an alternative to stamps. In December 2020, 590,000 people sent cards with these handwritten codes.

== Design ==
When the first postage stamps were issued in the 1840s, they followed an almost identical standard in shape, size and general subject matter. They were rectangular in shape. They bore the images of queens, presidents and other political figures. They also depicted the denomination of the postage-paid, and with the exception of the United Kingdom, (Note: When the Universal Postal Union began requiring the name of the country on stamps used in the international mails, the United Kingdom, as traditionally being the first country to issue stamps for postage, never put the country name on their stamps.) depicted the name of the country from which issued. (Note: Stamps not intended for international mail, such as postage due stamps, do not need to have the country's name.) Nearly all early postage stamps depict images of national leaders only.

Soon after the introduction of the postage stamp, other subjects and designs began to appear. Some designs were welcome, others widely criticized. For example, in 1869, the United States Post Office broke the tradition of depicting presidents or other famous historical figures, instead using other subjects including a train and horse.(See: 1869 Pictorial Issue.) The change was greeted with general disapproval, and sometimes harsh criticism from the American public.

=== Perforations ===
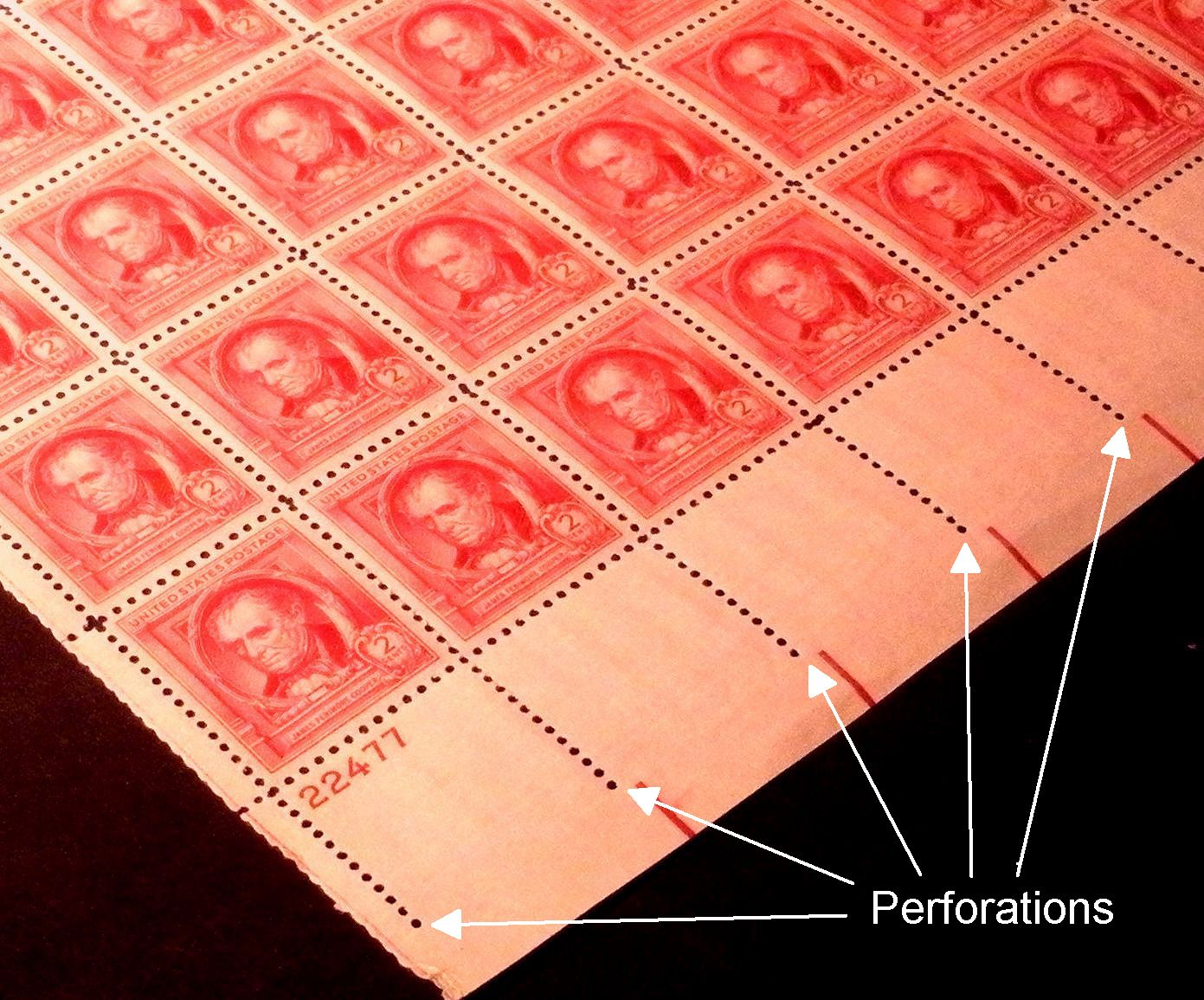
Rows of perforations in a sheet of 1940 postage stamps

The Penny Red, 1854 issue, the first officially perforated postage stamp

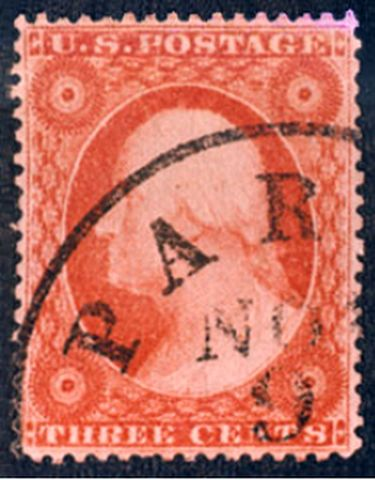
The first officially perforated United States stamp (1857)

Perforations are small holes made between individual postage stamps on a sheet of stamps, facilitating separation of a desired number of stamps. The resulting frame-like, rippled edge surrounding the separated stamp defines a characteristic meme for the appearance of a postage stamp.

In the first decade of postage stamps' existence (depending on the country), stamps were issued without perforations. Scissors or other cutting mechanisms were required to separate a desired number of stamps from a full sheet. If cutting tools were not used, individual stamps were torn off. This is evidenced by the ragged edges of surviving examples. Mechanically separating stamps from a sheet proved an inconvenience for postal clerks and businesses, both dealing with large numbers of individual stamps on a daily basis. By 1850, methods such as rouletting wheels were being devised in efforts of making stamp separation more convenient, and less time-consuming.

The United Kingdom was the first country to issue postage stamps with perforations. The first machine specifically designed to perforate sheets of postage stamps was invented in London by Henry Archer, an Irish landowner and railroad man from Dublin, Ireland. The 1850 Penny Red was the first stamp to be perforated during trial course of Archer's perforating machine. After a period of trial and error and modifications of Archer's invention, new machines based on the principles pioneered by Archer were purchased and in 1854 the United Kingdom postal authorities started continuously issuing perforated postage stamps in the Penny Red and all subsequent designs.

In the United States, the use of postage stamps caught on quickly and became more widespread when on 3 March 1851, the last day of its legislative session, Congress passed the Act of March 3, 1851 (An Act to reduce and modify the Rates of Postage in the United States). Similarly introduced on the last day of the Congressional session four years later, the Act of March 3, 1855 required the prepayment of postage on all mailings. Thereafter, postage stamp use in the United States quickly doubled, and by 1861 had quadrupled.

In 1856, under the direction of Postmaster General James Campbell, Toppan and Carpenter, (commissioned by the United States government to print United States postage stamps through the 1850s) purchased a rotary machine designed to separate stamps, patented in England in 1854 by William and Henry Bemrose, who were printers in Derby, England. The original machine cut slits into the paper rather than punching holes, but the machine was soon modified.

The first stamp issue to be officially perforated, the 3-cent George Washington, was issued by the United States Post Office on 24 February 1857. Between 1857 and 1861, all stamps originally issued between 1851 and 1856 were reissued with perforations. Initial capacity was insufficient to perforate all stamps printed, thus perforated issues used between February and July 1857 are scarce and quite valuable.

=== Shapes and materials ===
In addition to the most common rectangular shape, stamps have been issued in geometric (circular, triangular and pentagonal) and irregular shapes. The United States issued its first circular stamp in 2000 as a hologram of the Earth. Sierra Leone and Tonga have issued stamps in the shapes of fruit. Stamps that are printed on sheets are generally separated by perforations, though, more recently, with the advent of gummed stamps that do not have to be moistened prior to affixing them, designs can incorporate smooth edges (although a purely decorative perforated edge is often present).

Stamps are most commonly made from paper designed specifically for them, and are printed in sheets, rolls, or small booklets. Less commonly, postage stamps are made of materials other than paper, such as embossed foil (sometimes of gold). Switzerland made a stamp that contained a bit of lace and one of wood. The United States produced one of plastic. East Germany issued a stamp of synthetic chemicals. In the Netherlands a stamp was made of silver foil. Bhutan issued one with its national anthem on a playable record.

=== Graphic characteristics ===
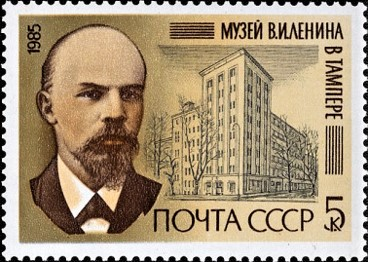
The 1985 postage stamp for the 115th birth anniversary of Vladimir Lenin. Portrait of Lenin (based on a 1900 photography of Y. Mebius in Moscow) with the Tampere Lenin Museum.

The subjects found on the face of postage stamps are generally what defines a particular stamp issue to the public and are often a reason why they are saved by collectors or history enthusiasts. Graphical subjects found on postage stamps have ranged from the early portrayals of kings, queens and presidents to later depictions of ships, birds and satellites, famous people, historical events, comics, dinosaurs, hobbies (knitting, stamp collecting), sports, holiday themes, and a plethora of other subjects too numerous to list.

Artists, designers, engravers and administrative officials are involved with the choice of subject matter and the method of printing stamps. Early stamp images were almost always produced from an engraving—a design etched into a steel die, which was then hardened and whose impression was transferred to a printing plate. Using an engraved image was deemed a more secure way of printing stamps as it was nearly impossible to counterfeit a finely detailed image with raised lines for anyone but a master engraver. In the mid-20th century, stamp issues produced by other forms of printing began to emerge, such as lithography, photogravure, intaglio and web offset printing. These later printing methods were less expensive and typically produced images of lesser quality.

=== Scents ===
Occasionally, postal authorities issue novelty "scented" or "aromatic" stamps which contain a scent, more readily apparent when rubbed. The effect is achieved by using ink which contains microcapsules that provide the desired fragrance when broken. The scent usually only lasts for a limited time after production, such as a few months or years. Such stamps are usually related to aromatic subjects including coffee, roses, grapes, chocolate, vanilla, cinnamon, pine needles or freshly baked bread. The first scented stamps were issued by Bhutan in 1973.

== Types ==
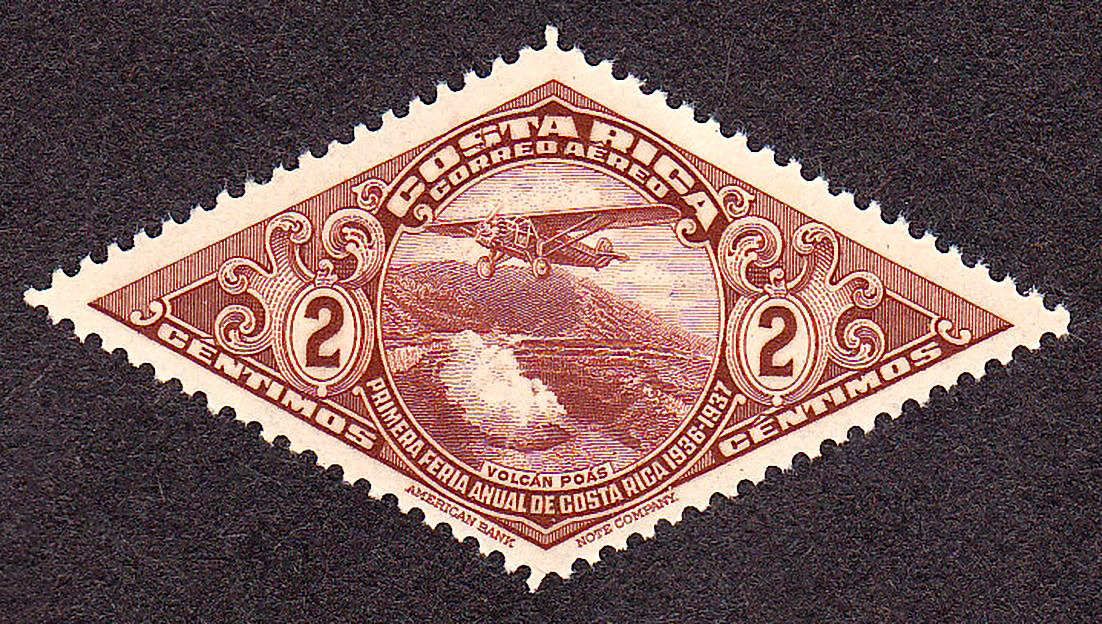
A Costa Rica Airmail stamp of 1937

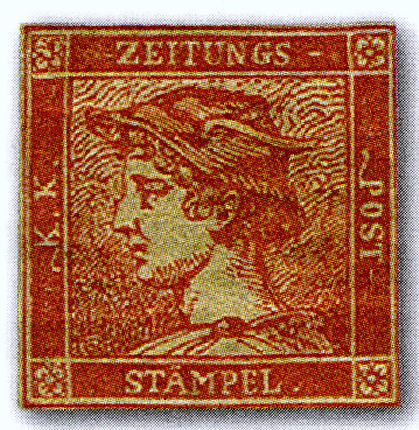
The Red Mercury, a rare 1856 newspaper stamp of Austria

- Airmail stamp – for payment of airmail service. The term "airmail" or an equivalent is usually printed on special airmail stamps. Airmail stamps typically depict images of airplanes and/or famous pilots and were used when airmail was a special type of mail delivery separate from mail delivered by train, ship or automobile. Aside from mail with local destinations, today almost all other mail is transported by aircraft and thus airmail is now the standard method of delivery. Scott has a separate category and listing for United States Airmail Postage. Prior to 1940, the Scott Catalogue did not have a special designation for airmail stamps. The various major stamp catalogs have different numbering systems and may not always list airmail stamps the same way.
- ATM stamp – stamps dispensed by automates and have their value imprinted only at the time of purchase
- Booklet stamp – stamps produced and issued in booklet format
- Carrier's stamp
- Certified mail stamp
- Cinderella stamp (see also: Poster stamp)
- Coil stamps – tear-off stamps issued individually in a vending machine, or purchased in a roll
- Commemorative stamp – a stamp which is issued for a limited time to commemorate a person or event Anniversaries of birthdays and historical events are among the most common examples.
- Computer vended postage – advanced secure postage that uses information-based indicia (IBI) technology. IBI uses a two-dimensional bar code (Datamatrix or PDF417) to encode the originating address, date of mailing, postage and a digital signature to verify the stamp.
- Customised stamp – a stamp on which the image can be chosen by the purchaser by sending in a photograph or by use of the computer. Some are not true stamps but technically meter labels.
- Definitive stamps – stamps for everyday postage and are usually produced to meet current postal rates. They often have less appealing designs than commemoratives, though there are notable exceptions. The same design may be used for many years. The use of the same design over an extended period may lead to unintended colour varieties. This may make them just as interesting to philatelists as are commemoratives. A good example would be the US 1903 regular issues, their designs being very picturesque and ornamental. Definitive stamps are often issued in a series of stamps with different denominations.
- Express mail stamp / special delivery stamp
- Late fee stamp – issued to show payment of a fee to allow inclusion of a letter or package in the outgoing dispatch although it has been turned in after the cut-off time
- Local post stamps – used on mail in a local post; a postal service that operates only within a limited geographical area, typically a city or a single transportation route. Some local posts have been operated by governments, while others, known as private local posts, have been operated by for-profit companies.
- Make up stamp – a stamp with a very small value, used to make up the difference when postage rates are increased
- Military stamp – stamp for a country's armed forces, usually using a special postal system
- Minisheet – a commemorative issue smaller than a regular full sheet of stamps, but with more than one stamp Minisheets often contain a number of different stamps and often have a decorative border. See also souvenir sheets
- Newspaper stamp – used to pay the cost of mailing newspapers and other periodicals
- Official mail stamp – issued for use by the government or a government agency
- Occupation stamp – a stamp for use by an occupying army or by the occupying army or authorities for use by civilians
- Non-denominated postage – postage stamp that remains valid even after the price has risen. It is also known as a permanent or "forever" stamp.
- Overprint – a regularly issued stamp, such as a commemorative or a definitive issue, that has been changed after issuance by "printing over" some part of the stamp. Denominations can be changed in this manner.
- Perforated stamps – While this term usually refers to perforations around a stamp to divide a sheet into individual stamps, it can also be used for stamps perforated across the middle with letters or a pattern or monogram. They are known as "perfins". The modified stamps are usually purchased by corporations to guard against theft by employees.
- Personalised stamps – allow the user to add their own image
- Pneumatic post stamps – for mail sent using pressurized air tubes, only produced in Italy
- Postage and revenue stamps – stamps which were equally valid for postal and fiscal use
- Postage currency postage stamps used as currency rather than as postage
- Postage due – a stamp showing that the full postage has not been paid, and indicating the amount owed. The United States Post Office Department has issued "parcel post postage due" stamps
- Postal tax – a stamp indicating that a tax above the postage rate required for sending letters has been paid. This is often mandatory on mail issued on a particular day or for a few days.
- Poster stamp (see also: Cinderella stamp)
- Self-adhesive stamp – not requiring moisture to stick, self-sticking
- Semi-postal / charity stamp – a stamp with an additional charge for charity. The use of semi-postal stamps is at the option of the purchaser. Countries including Belgium and Switzerland often use charitable fund-raising design stamps which are desirable for collectors.
- Souvenir sheet – a commemorative issue in large format valid for postage often containing a perforated or imperforate stamp as part of its design See also minisheet.
- Specimen stamp – sent to postmasters and postal administrations so that they are able to identify valid stamps and to avoid forgeries
- Test stamp – a label not valid for postage, used by postal authorities to test sorting and cancelling machines or machines that can detect a stamp on an envelope. May also be known as dummy or training stamps
- Variable value stamps - dispensed by machines that print the cost of the postage at the time the stamp is dispensed
- War tax stamp – a variation on the postal tax stamp to defray the cost of war
- Water-activated stamp – For many years, water-activated stamps were the only type available, so this term entered into use with the advent of self-adhesive stamps. The adhesive or gum on a water-activated stamp must be moistened (usually by licking, thus the stamps are also known as "lick and stick").

Apart from these, there are also revenue stamps (used to collect taxes or fees on items like documents, tobacco, alcoholic drinks, hunting licenses, and medicines) and telegraph stamps (for sending telegrams), which fall in a separate category from postage stamps.

== First day covers ==
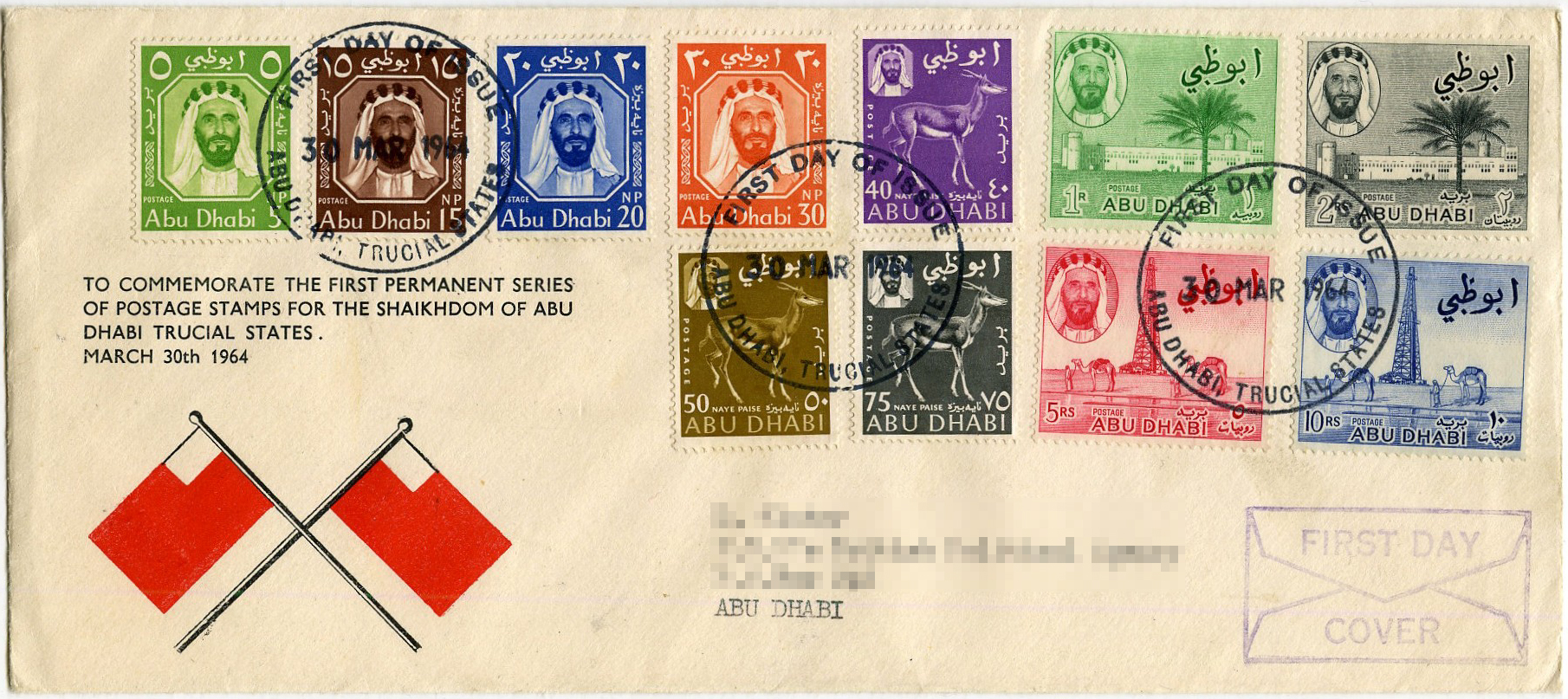
A philatelic First Day Cover from Abu Dhabi

Postage stamps are first issued on a specific date, often referred to as the First day of issue. A first day cover usually consists of an envelope, a postage stamp and a postmark with the date of the stamp's first day of issue thereon. Starting in the mid-20th century some countries began assigning the first day of issue to a place associated with the subject of the stamp design, such as a specific town or city. There are two basic types of First Day Covers (FDCs) noted by collectors. The first and often most desirable type among advanced collectors is a cover sent through the mail in the course of everyday usage, without the intention of the envelope and stamp ever being retrieved and collected. The second type of FDC is often referred to as "Philatelic", that is, an envelope and stamp sent by someone with the intention of retrieving and collecting the mailed item at a later time and place. The envelope used for this type of FDC often bears a printed design or cachet of its own in correspondence with the stamp's subject and is usually printed well in advance of the first day of issue date. The latter type of FDC is usually far more common; it is usually inexpensive and relatively easy to acquire. Covers which were sent without any secondary purpose are considered non-philatelic and often are much more challenging to find and collect.

== Souvenir or miniature sheets and block souvenirs ==
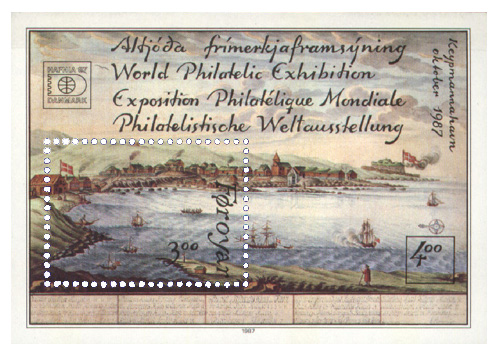
A 1987 Faroe Islands miniature sheet, in which the stamps form a part of a larger image

Postage stamps are sometimes issued in souvenir sheets or miniature sheets containing one or a small number of stamps. Souvenir sheets typically include additional artwork or information printed on the selvage, the border surrounding the stamps. Sometimes the stamps make up a greater picture. A block souvenir is when the grouping of stamps include the whole series and may not have the decorative features printed on the selvage. Some countries, and some issues, are produced as individual stamps as well as sheets.

== Stamp collecting ==
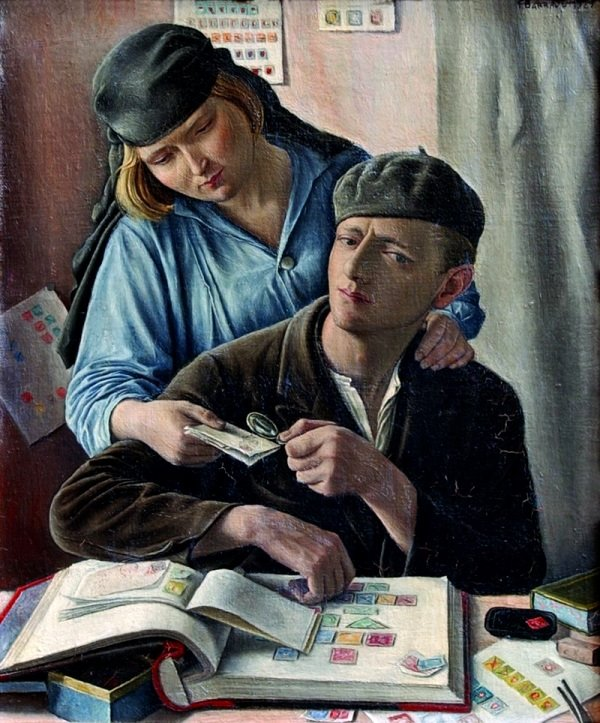
Le Philatéliste by François Barraud (1929)

Stamp collecting is a hobby. Collecting is not the same as philately, which is defined as the study of stamps. The creation of a valuable or comprehensive collection, however, may require some philatelic knowledge.

Stamp collectors are an important source of revenue for some small countries that create limited runs of elaborate stamps designed mainly to be bought by stamp collectors. The stamps produced by these countries may far exceed their postal needs. Hundreds of countries, each producing scores of different stamps each year, resulted in 400,000 different types of stamps in existence by 2000. Annual world output averages about 10,000 types.

Some countries authorize the production of postage stamps that have no postal use, (Note: See, for example, the low value Afghanistan issues of 1964.) but are intended instead solely for collectors. Other countries issue large numbers of low denomination stamps that are bundled together in starter packs for new collectors. Official reprints are often printed by companies who have purchased or contracted for those rights and such reprints see no postal use. All of these stamps are often found "canceled to order", meaning they are postmarked without ever having passed through the postal system. Most national post offices produce stamps that would not be produced if there were no collectors, some to a far more prolific degree than others.

Sales of stamps to collectors who do not use them for mailing can result in large profits. Examples of excessive issues have been the stamps produced by Nicholas F. Seebeck and stamps produced for the component states of the United Arab Emirates. Seebeck operated in the 1890s as an agent of Hamilton Bank Note Company. He approached Latin American countries with an offer to produce their entire postage stamp needs for free. In return. he would have exclusive rights to market stamps to collectors. Each year a new issue would be produced, but would expire at the end of the year. This assured Seebeck of a continuing supply of remainders. In the 1960s, printers such as the Barody Stamp Company contracted to produce stamps for the separate Emirates and other countries. The sparse population of the desert states made it wholly unlikely that many of these stamps would ever be used for mailing purposes, and earned them the name of the "sand dune" countries.

== Famous stamps ==
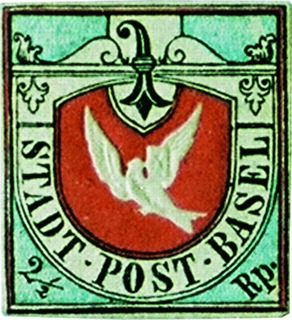
The Basel Dove stamp

- Basel Dove
- British Guiana 1c magenta
- Hawaiian Missionaries
- Inverted Head 4 Annas
- Inverted Jenny
- Mauritius "Post Office"
- Penny Black
- Red Revenue "Small One Dollar"
- Scinde Dawk
- Treskilling Yellow
- Uganda Cowries

== See also ==
- Artistamp
- Cancellation (mail)
- Errors, freaks, and oddities
- List of entities that have issued postage stamps (A–E)
- List of entities that have issued postage stamps (F–L)
- List of entities that have issued postage stamps (M–Z)
- List of most expensive philatelic items
- List of stamp catalogues
- Mail art
- Philatelic fakes and forgeries
- Stamp catalog
