= Essay (philately) =

Designs created during the development of postage stamps

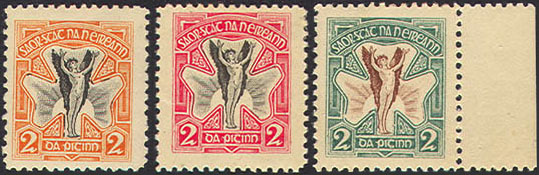
Three 1922 Irish bi-colour essays printed by Hely Ltd.

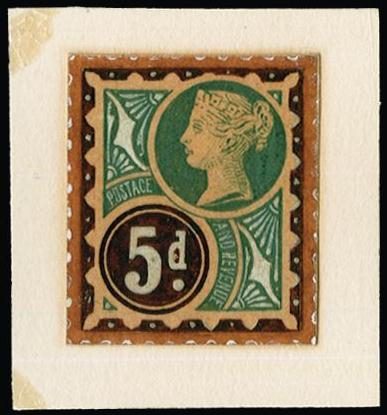
A British postage stamp essay, believed to be for the 1887 Jubilee issue.

In philately, an essay is a design for a proposed stamp submitted to the postal authorities for consideration but not used, or used after alterations have been made. By contrast, a proof is a trial printing of an accepted stamp.

Both essays and proofs are rare, as usually just a few are produced. Although intended for internal use by printers and official bodies, essays sometimes find their way onto the philatelic market.

== See also ==
- Prince Consort Essay
