= Non-denominated postage =

Type of postage stamp

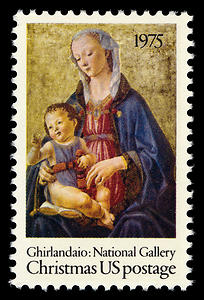
The first United States non-denominated postage stamp, issued in 1975, was valued at 10 cents.

Non-denominated postage is a postage stamp intended to meet a certain postage rate, but printed without the denomination, the price for that rate. They may retain full validity for the intended rate, regardless of later rate changes, or they may retain validity only for the original purchase price. In many English-speaking countries, it is called non-value indicator or non-value indicated (NVI) postage. They are used in many countries and reduce the cost of printing large issues of low-value make up stamps.

== UPU approval ==
The Universal Postal Union approved the use of non-denominated stamps on international mail in 1995.

== Canada ==
Canada's first non-denominational stamp was the 1981 "A" Definitive, featuring a stylized maple leaf. It was issued during a transition from the first class domestic rate 17¢ to 30¢ and was valued at 30 cents. In 2006, Canada's next NVI was called the "Permanent" stamp, which is a trademarked term. It was originally marked by a white capital "P" overlaid on a red maple leaf, which is itself within a white circle. Later releases, such as the 2009 Silver Dart commemorative, varied the colours. In that example, the Maple Leaf around the "P" is white and the "P" is dropped out. The circle does not appear. In announcing its decision to adopt non-denominated postage in 2006, Canada Post noted that it had to print more than 60 million one-cent stamps following the last price increase in 2005. The Canadian NVI program was essentially equivalent to the American NVI program, as both covered regular domestic first-class mail. One Canada Post NVI stamp covers the cost of mailing a standard letter up to 30 g within Canada.

On 11 December 2013, Canada Post unveiled its Five-point Action Plan, which temporarily removed "Permanent" stamps from sale, although they remained valid for postage. On 31 March, the regular domestic stamp price increased from CA$0.63 to CA$0.85 (roll & bundle issued stamps) and up to $1.00 for single stamp purchase, beginning on 31 March 2014. Sale of "Permanent" stamps resumed on that day at the new rate.

== Czech Republic ==
Czech stamps for domestic priority mail are labeled "A", stamps for domestic, non-priority mail are labeled "B", stamps for international mail to European countries are marked "E", and stamps for international mail to non-European countries are marked "Z".

== India ==
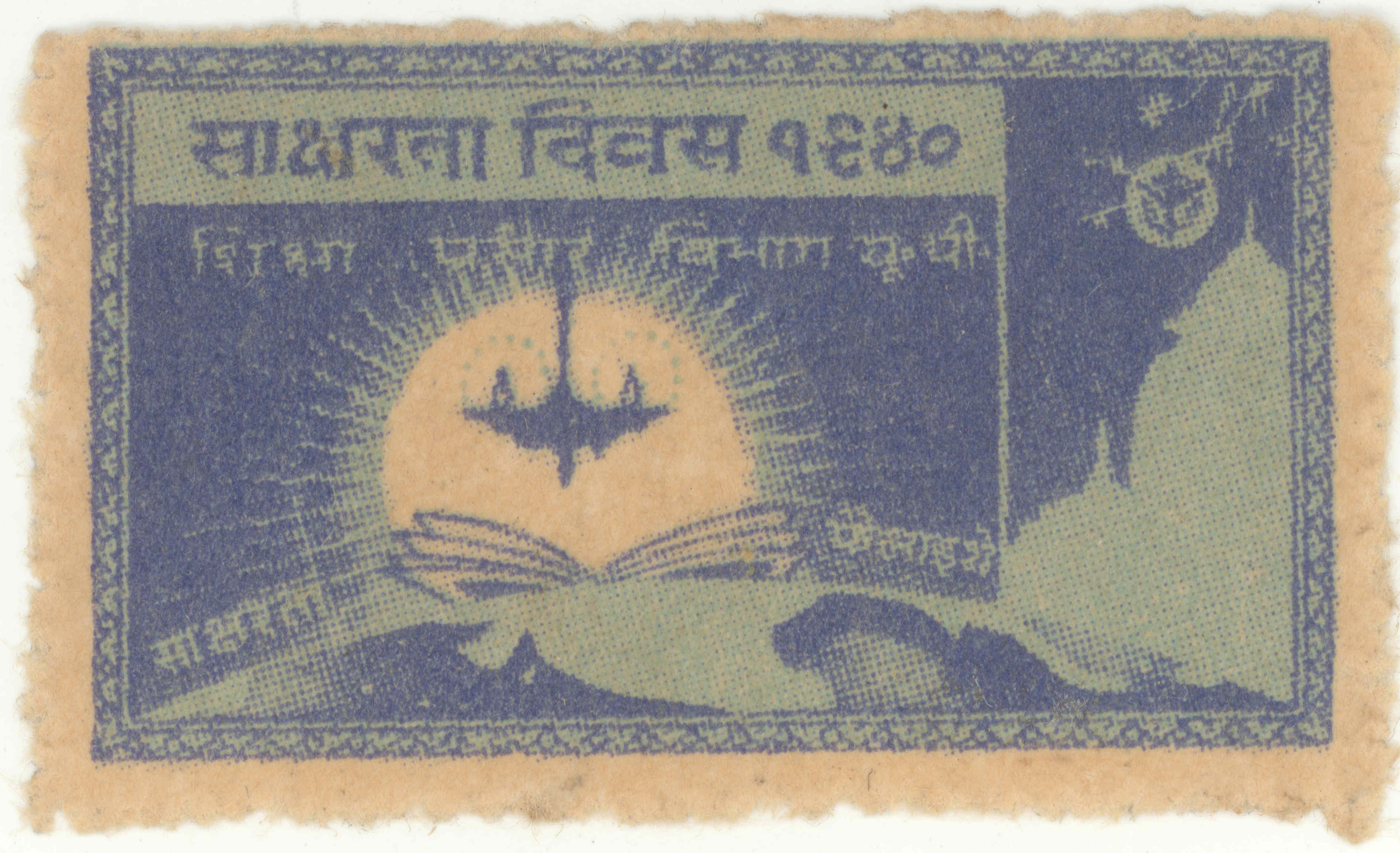
Stamp Issued by Department of Education, Government of United Province, British India, 1940

In 1940, the Government of United Province of British India issued a non-denominated stamp marking Literacy Day.

== Republic of Ireland ==
An Post issue "N" stamps at the current domestic posting rate, which allow posting throughout both the Republic of Ireland and Northern Ireland; and "W" stamps at the current international letter mail rate.

There were formerly "E" stamps for postage to within the European Union, but this postage rate has been discontinued.

All three values were introduced in 2000 prior to the Euro changeover; however, only "N" stamps were available for many years after that, and only by specific request at post offices; generally as special occasion stamps such as weddings or birthday celebration stamps which may be purchased significantly in advance of use. However, "N" and "W" stamps are now widely sold, and are the only commonly available pre-printed stamps sold.

== The Netherlands ==
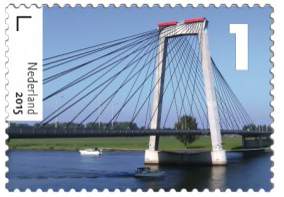
A 2015 first-class stamp of the Netherlands

PostNL now issues all first-class stamps as NVIs, which simply bear a large numeral "1" that varies to match the typography used for each particular issue. Stamps meeting the first-class rate to Europe additionally bore the marking "Europa", and those to foreign destinations outside of Europe the marking "Wereld" ("World"); presently, all stamps for destinations outside the Netherlands are marked "Internationaal" ("international"), with no distinctions for destinations within or outside Europe.

== New Zealand ==
New Zealand Post started issuing the Kiwistamp in 2009. One stamp will always be worth the required postage of a Standard Post medium domestic letter. Customers may use multiple Kiwistamps or mix them with denominated stamps to make up the required postage for bigger domestic or international mail.

== Singapore ==
Singapore has two NVIs today: 1st Local and 2nd Local. The first Singapore NVIs were issued in 1995; almost every issue had a "For Local Addresses Only" stamp. Later, in 2004, a new NVI denomination was released: "2nd Local". Since then almost all issues have "1st Local" stamps, and some have "2nd Local" stamps, rather than the previous "For Local Addresses Only". 1st Local stamps are valid for standard letters within Singapore up to 20 g, and 2nd Local stamps are valid for standard letters within Singapore up to 40 g.

== Russia ==
Russian Post sells envelopes and postcards with pre-printed non-denominated stamps for domestic mail, A for regular domestic mail, B for postcards, and D for registered mail.

== Scandinavia ==
=== Åland ===
Åland uses the following NVI denominations: Lokalpost (domestic, within Åland only), Inrikes (Finland), Europa (Europe), Världen (the world), 1 klass (1st class), 2 klass (2nd class), and Julpost (Christmas mail). As of February 2024, the current values of non-denominated Åland postage stamps, or no-value indicator (NVI) are: Lokalpost (domestic, within Åland only): €2.80, Inrikes (Finland): €2.90, Europa (Europe): €3.20, Världen (the world): €3.40, 1 klass (1st class): €2.80, 2 klass (2nd class): €2.40 and Julpost (Christmas mail): €1.50.

=== Finland ===
Finland's first NVI stamp (ikimerkki) was issued on 2.3.1992. There are two denominations, one valid for domestic 1st class, or overnight, domestic letter of up to 50 g and the other for similar 2nd class letter. The stamps may be combined for more expensive tariffs.

=== Norway ===
Posten Norge launched these on 1 September 2005. They were first only used for domestic mail, later expanded to include Europe and World denominations. They are called Norwegian: Valørløse frimerker (Value free stamps).

=== Sweden ===
On the 2nd of April 1979, the first non-denominated stamps in Sweden were issued. They were non-expiring stamps with unlimited time of validity ("Forever-stamps") and one stamp is (still) valid for a domestic letter up to 100 g. These “Discount stamps”, with a purchase price of SEK 1.00 but a postage value of up to SEK 2.50 (at the time of issuance), were issued to promote letter writing and could only be purchased by households in Sweden and only during the period April – June 1979.

Since 1997 the state-owned Swedish postal company has been issuing non-denominated stamps on a regular basis. These stamps are “Forever-stamps” with unlimited validity for domestic letter (1 stamp) and since 1998 also for international mail (2 stamps). The purchase price for these stamps are the same as the current postage for a domestic mail up to 50g.

Sweden issues two forms of NVI valid for letters within Sweden of up to 50 g. These stamps may be combined when the weight of a letter exceeds 50 g. For up to 100 g – use two stamps; for up to 250 g – use 4 stamps; 500 g – 6 stamps; 1 kg – 8 stamps; 2 kg – 12 stamps. There are no longer surcharges to bulkier letters. The Swedish name for NVI stamps is valörlösa frimärken.

1. Brev: first class delivery within Sweden. Brev ('letter') or Brev Inrikes ('domestic letter') is printed on the stamps. Price as of January 2020 - 11 SEK;
2. Julpost: first class delivery within Sweden. Julpost ('Christmas mail') is printed on the stamp. Price is 0.50 SEK lower than brev. Intended for use in a fixed period before Christmas.

NVIs that are no longer issued, but still valid for franking:

1. Ekonomibrev: used to be second class (up to three days for delivery) within Sweden. Price as of January 2009 - 5.50 SEK. The service no longer exists.
2. Föreningsbrev: used to be rate for non-profit organizations. Price as of January 2009 - 5.00 SEK. The service no longer exists.

Regular first class stamps can also be used to mail letters abroad, providing that their combined value corresponds to the appropriate rate by Swedish Post. For instance, to mail a letter up to 50 g in weight, two Brev stamps are required.

== United Kingdom ==
Non-denominated postage was first introduced in the United Kingdom in 1989 for domestic mail, in part as a workaround to the problem of fast-changing rates, the Royal Mail issuing "non-value indicated" Machins using textual inscriptions "1ST" and "2ND" to indicate class of service rather than a monetary value. It later introduced further stamps, including for worldwide and European use, for different weights, and for postcards.

== United States ==
=== Letter-denominated stamps ===
In past years, non-denominated postage issued by the United States differed from the issues of other countries, in that the stamps retained their original monetary value. Some stamps, such as those intended for local or bulk mail rate, were issued without denomination.

This practice began in 1975, when there was uncertainty as to the timing and extent of a rate increase from ten cents for the first ounce of first-class postage as the end of the year approached. Christmas stamps were released without denomination, giving the United States Postal Service (USPS) flexibility to refrain from reprinting hundreds of millions of stamps in a new denomination. The rate increase, to thirteen cents (US$0.13), occurred just after Christmas.

The United States also issued stamps with letter denomination, beginning from A, B, etc., during postal rate changes. After reaching the letter "H", this practice was discarded in favor of simply indicating the class of postage (e.g., first class) for which the stamp was intended.

=== Forever stamps ===
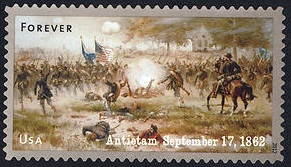
A 2012 U.S. Forever stamp

In 2006, the USPS applied for permission to issue a non-denominated first-class postage stamp that would remain valid regardless of future rate increases, termed a Forever stamp. The first Forever stamp, featuring the Liberty Bell and marked "USA first-class forever", was unveiled on March 26, 2007, and went on sale April 12, 2007, at 41 cents. In 2011, USPS converted all first-class stamps to the Forever format.

Forever stamps are sold at the prevailing first-class rate but remain valid for full first-class postage even after subsequent price increases. In 2013, the USPS extended the concept to international mail with the introduction of the Global Forever stamp. The program was further expanded in 2015 to include postcard, non-machinable surcharge, and additional-ounce stamps, which indicate their intended use rather than a printed denomination.

In later years, Forever stamps have been targeted by counterfeiters, with fraudulent versions sold online at discounted prices.
