= Newspaper stamp =

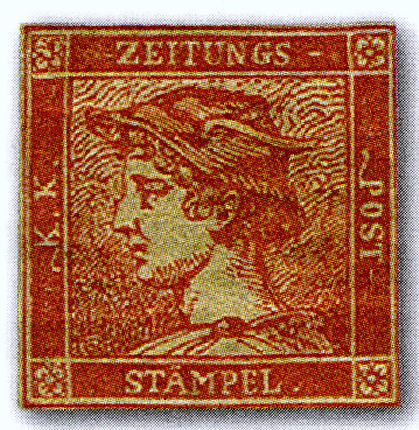
The Red Mercury, a rare newspaper stamp of 1856 Austria.

A newspaper stamp is a special type of postage stamp used to pay the cost of mailing newspapers and other periodicals. Although many types were issued in the 19th century, typically representing rates reduced from regular mail, they generally fell out of use in the mid-20th century, as mail services began to arrange bulk handling directly with publishers.

The exact use of newspaper stamps varied; small-value stamps were generally intended to be affixed to newspaper wrappers, in much the fashion of regular mail, but with values usually less than regular stamps. Higher values were used on bundles of newspapers, and later on receipts.

The first newspaper stamp was issued by Austria in 1851, and a number of nations soon followed suit. The newspaper stamps of the United States, in use from 1865 to 1898, were always intended for bulk shipments, and with face values ranging up to US$100, are the highest-value newspaper stamps.

Newspaper stamps seem to have been printed in great quantities, and almost all types are today inexpensive and easily acquired.

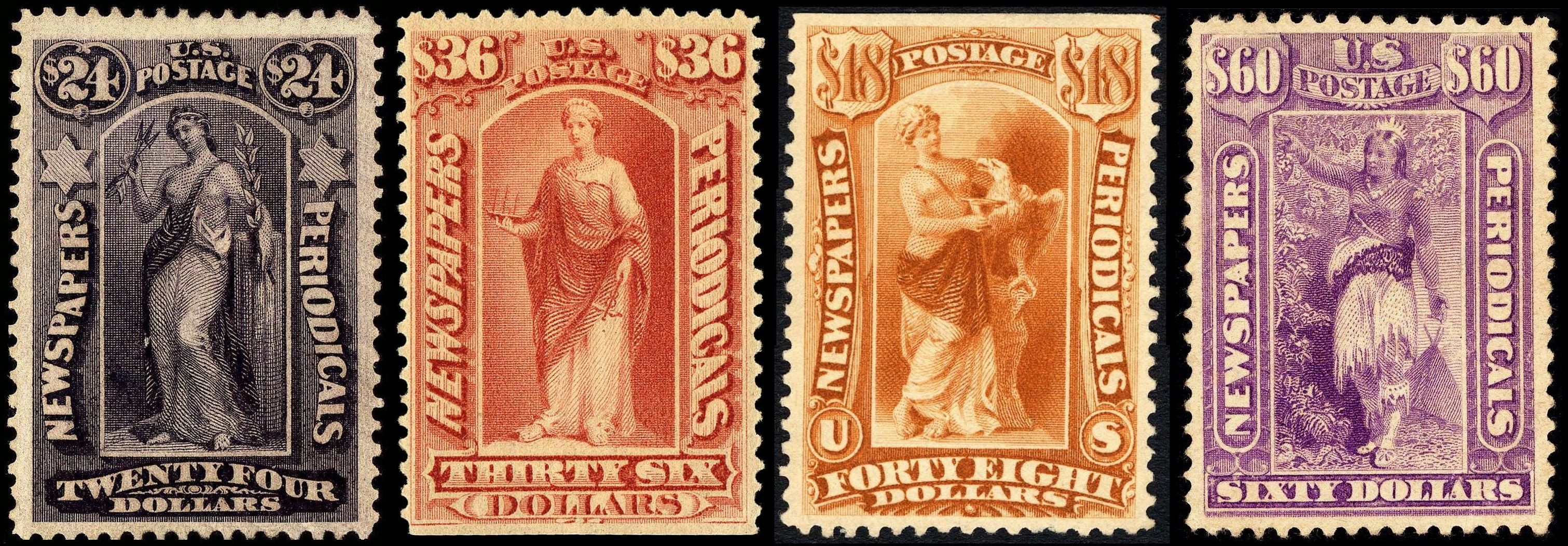
U.S. Newspapers & Periodicals stamps of 1875
