= Lovrenc Košir =

Austrian civil servant

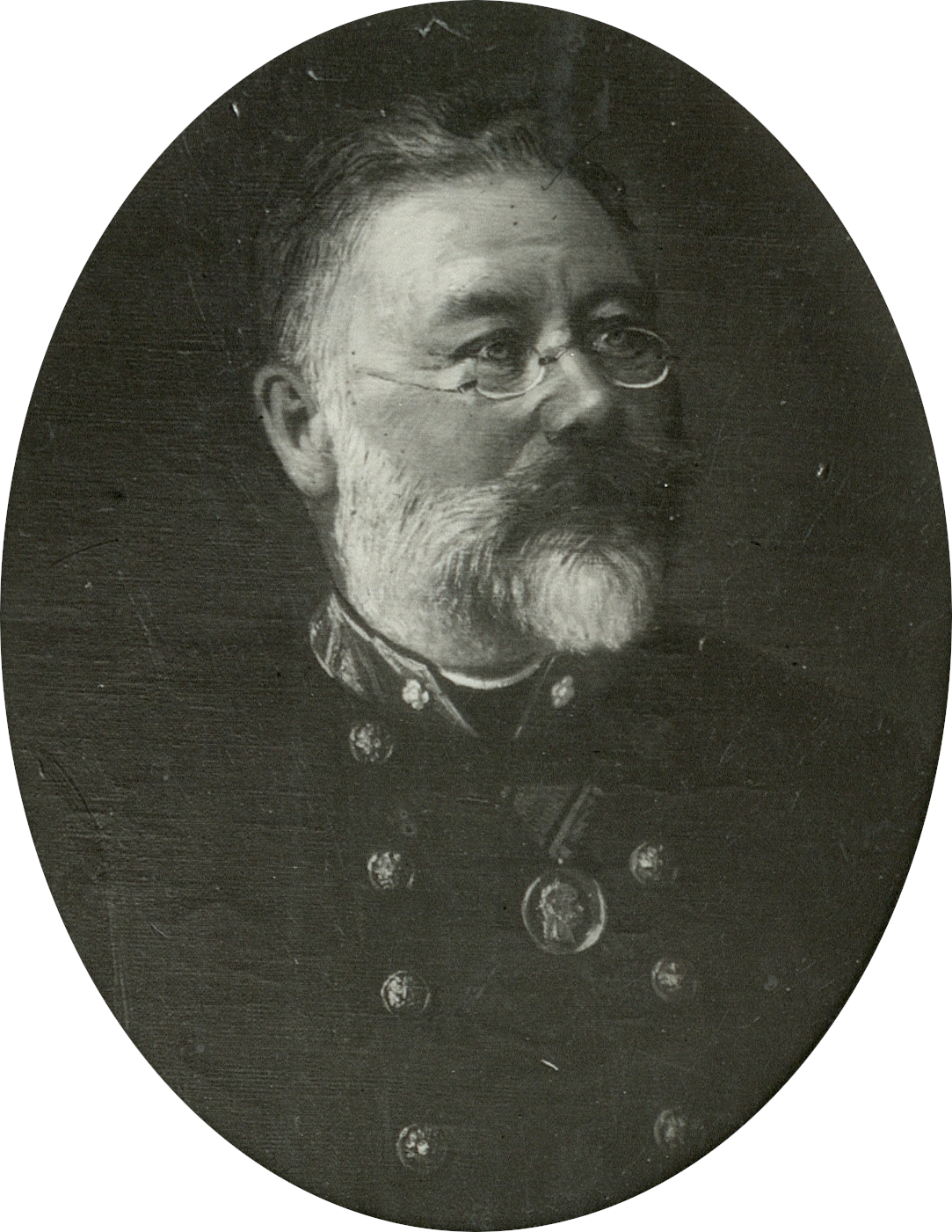
Lovrenc Košir

Lovrenc Košir, also Laurenz Koschier (29 July 1804 – 7 August 1879) was a Slovenian accountant and civil servant in the Austrian Empire, who worked in Ljubljana. He is notable as being one of the claimants to the title of the inventor of the postage stamp, besides Rowland Hill and James Chalmers. His claim was widely supported in Austria and Yugoslavia, and he was recognized as undisputed "conceptual inventor" of postage stamps in those two countries. Today, those claims are controversial and he is not seen as undisputed inventor any more, as there is evidence that his claims were based on misconstructions.

== Biography ==
Lovrenc Košir was born in Spodnja Luša, Carniola and baptized Laurentius Koschier. The Slovenized spelling of his name, Lovrenc Košir, appeared in print by 1937. He died in Vienna on 7 August 1879.

== Idea of adhesive tax postmarks ==
In 1835, five years before the introduction of the worldwide first stamps in Great Britain, Košir allegedly suggested the introduction of adhesive tax postmarks (aufklebbare Brieftaxstempel) to the Department of Commerce in Vienna, which was responsible for the postal system. These postmarks were to be used for the pre-payment of postage. He called them gepresste Papieroblate (pressed paper wafers). His suggestion was looked at in detail, but rejected for the time being. Košir conceived that the stamps would be modelled on the official sealing stamps that were already used in Austria. However, because he had contact with England, it is presumed that he got the idea from James Chalmers, who had already made stamp designs one year earlier than Košir. However, Chalmers did not submit his designs until three years after Košir's suggestion.

Only in 1858, Košir began to claim that he was the inventor of the idea of postage stamps. In 1869, Košir asked the Ministry of Finance to propose him for the Order of Franz Joseph for his "merits in the introduction of postage stamps". The Ministry responded that it "can't support Košir because there is no single official document to support his claims." In 1874, when the inaugural congress of the General Postal Union (GPU) was held in Bern, Switzerland, Košir sent a letter to it asking the congress to recognize him for his "work and commitment to the cause of the introduction of postage stamps". With the letter, Košir provided certain "documents" as a proof of his work. Košir claimed that in 1837, he shared his ideas on postage stamps with a certain English trader named Galloway, who then revealed the idea to Rowland Hill. Košir also claimed that he published his ideas in Allgemeine Zeitung newspapers in 1839. The congress refused Košir's request on the basis that all the documents he provided were uncertified copies, and not original documents.

The claim that Košir was the pioneer of the postage stamp concept was popularized by Amand von Schweiger-Lerchenfeld in his book Das neue Buch von der Weltpost (Vienna, 1901). Schweiger-Lerchenfeld's claim was based on his reading of the documents provided by Košir to the GPU congress in 1874. Despite the lack of critical analysis of those documents, Schweiger-Lerchenfeld became the main source for those who supported Košir as the inventor of the postage stamp. Schweiger-Lerchenfeld's claim was propagated by Yugoslavian philatelist Ferdinand Kobal who in 1948 published a book titled Lovrenc Košir in which he repeats the claims of Košir being the inventor of postage stamp.

The "documents" that Košir provided to the GPU in 1874 were found by Milomir Lj. Mićić in 1949 in the UPU (former GPU) archives in Berne, and then published by Mićić in 1954. Mićić opined that those documents support Košir's (and Schweiger-Lerchenfeld's) claims. The documents were then critically examined by historian Velimir Sokol from Zagreb, Yugoslavia, who published his findings in 1962. Sokol claimed that some of Košir's documents were forgeries while others do not directly confirm that he invented postage stamp. According to Sokol, those documents do not speak about postage stamps but about some more general ideas on the "reform of the postal service" which Košir proposed in 1830s. Only after the postal stamps were introduced, Košir tried to retroactively present his ideas as origins of postal stamps, although they do not mention postal stamp as such. Sokol also checked the archives of Allgemeine Zeitung and found no article written by Košir. Sokol concluded that Košir's claims were false and that he should not be considered a pioneer of postage stamps.

Based on Sokol's research, in 1979, the Philatelic Association of Slovenia took official position that Košir was not the inventor nor pioneer of postage stamps. Despite this, some philatelists and historians continued to support Schweiger-Lerchenfeld's claims. For example, Edward Gobetz, founder of the Slovenian Research Center of America, proposed in 1984 that the United States Postal Service issue a stamp dedicated to Košir.

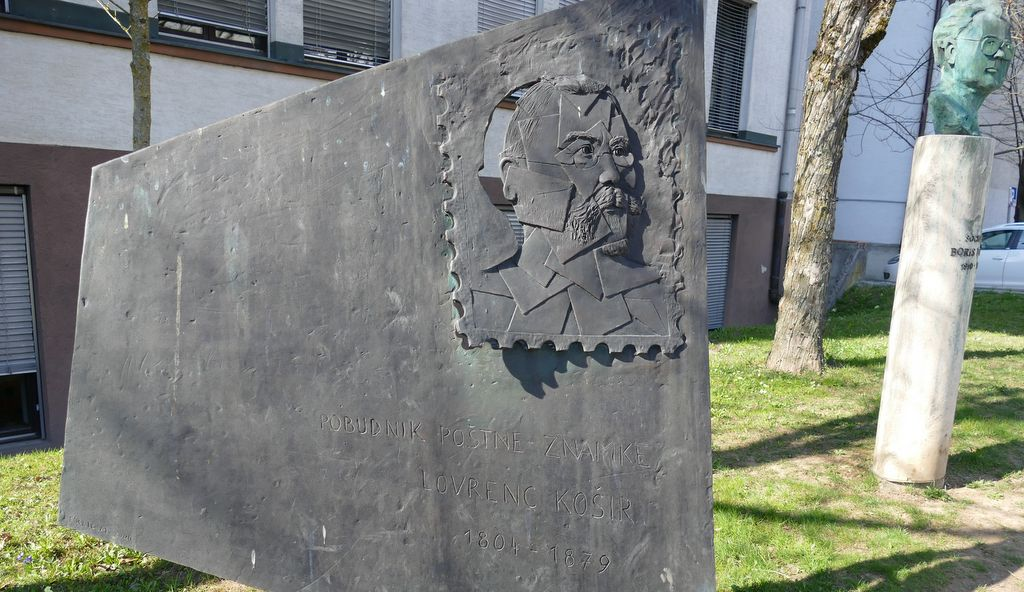
Memorial dedicated to Košir in Škofja Loka. He is credited as the "initiator" of postal stamps.

Košir was immortalised on several commemorative stamps in Austria, Slovenia and Yugoslavia. Both Austria and Yugoslavia were very much supportive of Lovrenc Košir being recognized as the one and only inventor of the postage stamp. On 21 August 1948, a commemorative stamp set was issued in Yugoslavia, which consisted of four stamps and showed his portrait. In the same year, the Yugoslav postal system issued an airmail stamp depicting Košir, his birth house in Spodnja Luša, and an aeroplane. What is special about this stamp is the allonge attached to each stamp. It has an inscription in Serbo-Croatian and in French giving information about Lovrenc Košir's contribution regarding the invention of stamps. On the centenary of his death 1979, Košir was depicted on an Austrian commemorative stamp (as Laurenz Koschier), with the inscription "pioneer of the postage stamp." In 2004, the Slovenian Post issued a commemorative stamp celebrating Košir's 200 years of birth.

== References and sources ==
=== Sources ===
- Huber, K. (1979) Altösterreich-Lexikon - Vom Altbrief bis zur Briefmarke.
- Koczynsk, Stephan. (1924) Die Geschichte der Stempelmarken in Österreich. Pages 440–442.
