= Dummy stamp =

Stamp-like label used for training postal workers or testing postal equipment

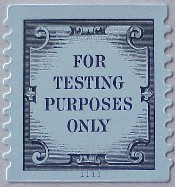
A 2004–05 test stamp of the United States.

A dummy stamp is a stamp-like label which is not valid for postal use. Dummy stamps are a form of cinderella stamp and the two principal types are test or training stamps, used to test postal equipment or train postal workers, and printer's sample stamps created to promote or demonstrate the printing capabilities of a stamp printer.

In the United States the term relates primarily to test and training stamps, while in the United Kingdom the term is used more widely to include promotional and sample stamps produced by printers. The term has been in use in the U.K. since at least 1949 when reports of proceedings of the Royal Philatelic Society, London referred to a display of "dummy stamps" produced in connection with the negotiation of a printing contract for the postage stamps of South Africa. In 1981, the British Philatelic Bulletin illustrated printer's sample stamps from the R.M. Phillips Collection produced by De La Rue.

== See also ==
- Test stamp
- Training stamp
- Specimen stamp
- Printer's sample stamp
