= Test stamp =

Type of stamp used for testing postal equipment

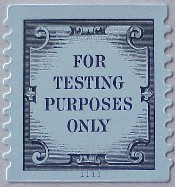
A 2004–05 test stamp of the United States

A test stamp is a label resembling a postage stamp that is used by postal authorities for testing equipment. They generally have the same size and shape as regular stamps, but with a minimal design. Although not normally made available to the general public, some have found their way into private hands, and they are a recognised stamp collecting speciality.

Test stamps are a form of cinderella stamp and in the United States are also commonly referred to as dummy stamps.

In some countries there may be cross-over between test and training stamps but while test stamps do not need any stated value, training stamps are often produced in a variety or values or are genuine stamps cancelled by bars as this assists with the training process.

== France ==
In France, test stamps have been used since 1849. There are about 40 different series, containing 600 references, in booklets, coils or simple sheets. The most popular series are "Bernard Palissy" or "Pic Vert".

== Germany ==
In Germany test stamps were used between 1915 and 1930 to show advertisers in stamp booklets what their advertisement would look like. Small series of booklets were produced with large coloured numbers instead of the stamps for this purpose. These booklets are now very rare.

== The United Kingdom ==
In the United Kingdom test stamps for coil dispensing machines are sometimes known as poached egg stamps, because of their design. They were printed in the same size and format as the definitive stamps of the UK and perforated in the same manner. The amount of ink used was also the same as actual postage stamps, so that they could be used to test the machines with material as close as possible to actual postage stamps. The colour of these test stamps was changed from green to black after 1937 when some test coils were accidentally left in a machine and used as half-penny stamps. At the time of this colour change, text was also added to the centre of the labels indicating their use. The stamps are no longer in use.

== The United States ==
The United States has made extensive used of test stamps with many different types issued over the years. The stamps have typically been made up into coils.

== The Netherlands, Sweden and Switzerland ==
These countries have also used test stamps.

== See also ==
- Training stamp
- Dummy stamp
- Specimen stamp
- Printer's sample stamp
