= Make up stamp =

Postage stamp with a small face value to make up difference in cost of postage

A make-up stamp is a postage stamp issued by postal authorities to make up the difference in the cost of postage when rates have been increased and stamps are not yet available in the new denomination and no other values exist for that purpose. There are two types:

- one with a numerical denomination printed on it
- one with no value printed on it, known as non-denominated postage

== Examples of denominated make up rate stamps ==
=== Australia ===
In Australia, six different 30¢ make-up stamps, three showing kangaroos and three depicting koala bears, all inscribed "Adelaide 2016" at the bottom, were on sale for just two days in January 2016. At the end of 2015, Australia Post decided that from 4 January 2016, they would increase the domestic rate from 70¢ to $1.50 but introduce a new rate for "standard letter", a slower service which was $1.00, 30¢ more than the previous first class rate. The supply of regular 30¢ Crocodile definitive stamps that customers could use to make up the new $1.00 rate were in short supply, so the Adelaide general post office pressed into service a slow 22-year-old CPS machine normally only used annually for stamp show souvenir stamps, etc., to print a quantity of 30¢ peel-and-stick stamps. The only retained machine was in Adelaide though all states had them from 1994.

Several of these 2016 Australian make-up stamps have been offered for sale on eBay at up to 1,000 times face value as well as used copies on covers.

=== Canada ===
Also in 2014, Canada Post issued a make-up stamp denominated 22¢ to allow use of the previous rate 63¢ stamps when the rate was increased to 85¢. It joined the existing definitive insect issue which did not have this value at that time and was printed in panes of 50 stamps.

=== Germany ===
Deutsche Post added two Internet-only make-up rate stamps, valued €0.02 to their website to allow customers to use up their Internet-purchased €0.58 stamps when the rate was increased to €0.60 for domestic mail and a €0.10 for registered mail and some international rates on 1 January 2014 but were no longer available after 31 March 2014.

=== United States ===
United States Postal Service issued a new 3¢ definitive stamp, illustrating a star with red and blue points, specifically as a make up stamp in June 2002. All first-class and postcard stamps issued since 2010 are Forever Stamps, meaning that no make-up stamp is necessary to use them after a rate change.
