= Spodnja Luša =

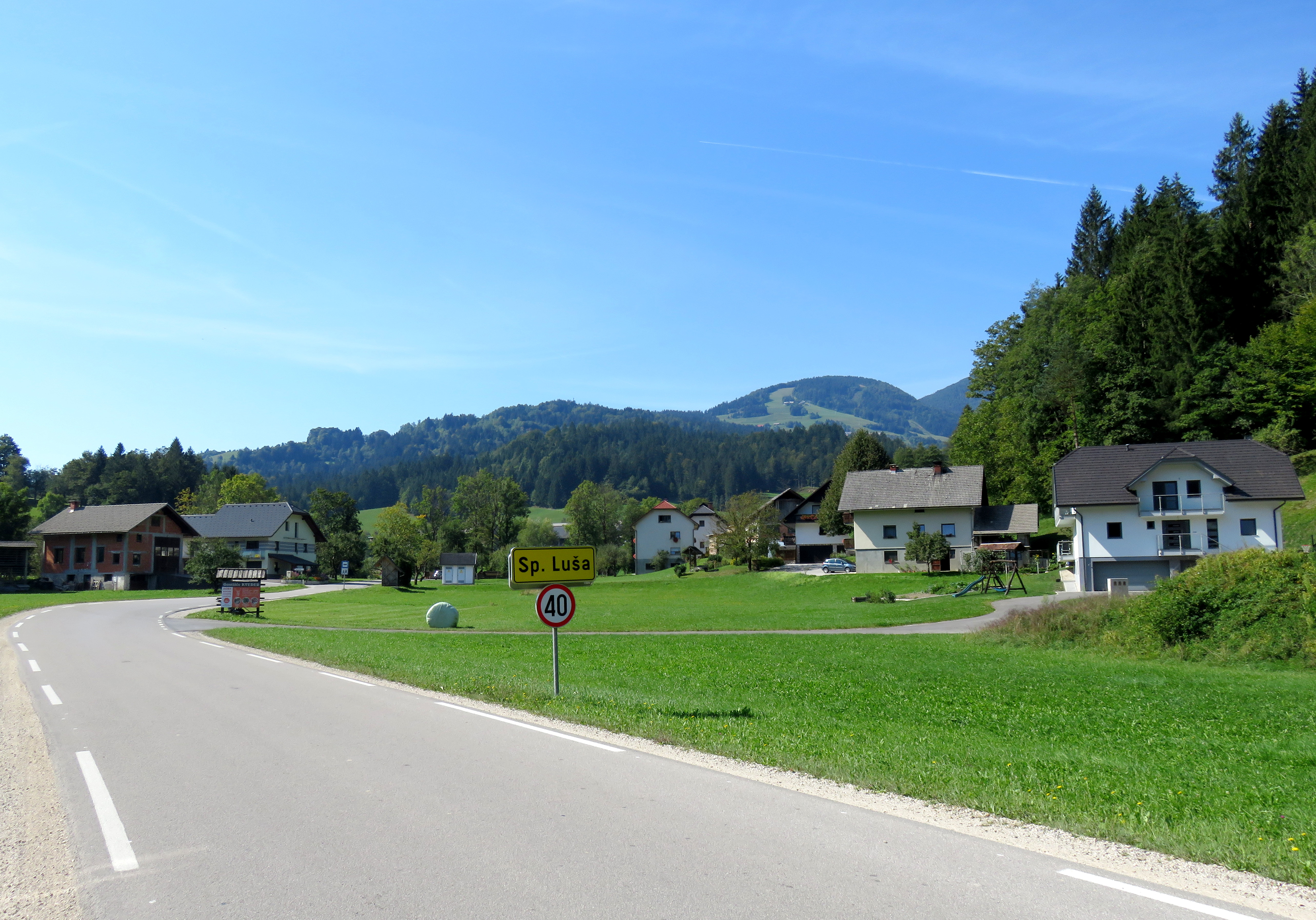

- Location in Slovenia
- Coordinates: 46°11′6.51″N 14°13′18.66″E
- Country: Slovenia
- Traditional region: Upper Carniola
- Statistical region: Upper Carniola
- Municipality: Škofja Loka

Area
  - Total: 4.48 km^{2} (1.73 sq mi)
- Elevation: 439.3 m (1,441 ft)

Population (2002)
  - Total: 130

Spodnja Luša (pronounced [ˈspoːdnja ˈluːʃa]; German: Unterluscha) is a settlement in the Municipality of Škofja Loka in the Upper Carniola region of Slovenia.

== Notable people ==
Notable people that were born or lived in Spodnja Luša include:

- Lovrenc Košir (1804–1879), civil servant and alleged postage stamp pioneer
