= Specimen stamp =

Postage stamp or indicia used to identify valid stamps and to avoid forgeries

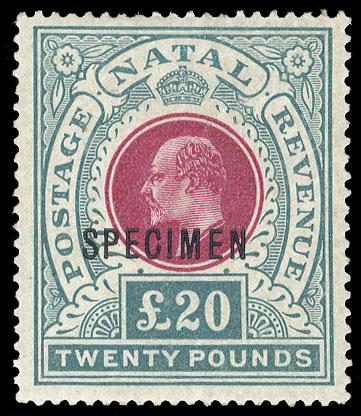
1902 Colony of Natal stamp, overprinted SPECIMEN in black showing Edward VII

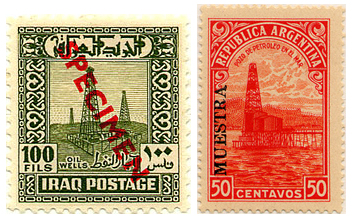
An Iraq and an Argentinian stamp, overprinted SPECIMEN

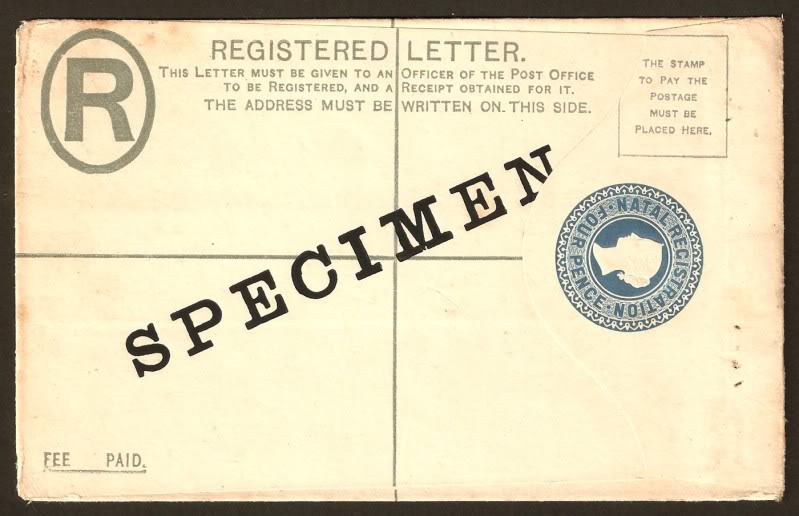
A specimen registered envelope from Natal.

A specimen stamp is a postage stamp or postal stationery indicium sent to postmasters and postal administrations so that they are able to identify valid stamps and to avoid forgeries. The usual method of invalidating the stamps is either overprinting in ink or perforating the word Specimen across the stamp and where English is not the common language, the words Muestra (Spanish), Monster (Dutch), Muster (German) or Образец (Russian, 'Obrasetz') have been used instead.

== History ==
Specimen stamps have been in use since the earliest issues and in 1840 examples of the Penny Black, Two Penny Blue and the Mulready Letter Sheet were sent to all British postmasters. These stamps were not marked in any way, but when the first British one shilling stamp was produced in 1847, examples sent to postmasters were marked with the word Specimen in order to prevent their postal use.

Since 1879, members of the Universal Postal Union have supplied stamps to each other through the UPU's International Bureau and stamps supplied this way have frequently found their way on to the philatelic market. Specimen stamps have no postal validity so postal administrations are free to distribute them as widely as they like and this can include to stamp dealers, philatelic magazines, government bodies, embassies and as promotional items for philatelists.

As many specimen stamps are worth more than the originals, they have often been forged. Inversely, many genuine specimens have had their overprints removed to make them resemble the much more expensive base stamps.

The use of specimen overprints is not restricted to postage stamps. It has also been used on revenue stamps and postal stationery, including International Reply Coupons. A unique use was by the Portuguese U.P.U. officials at the end of the 19th and early 20th centuries when they hand-stamped postal stationery from Cuba with the term "ULTRAMAR" (overseas) to prevent postal usage.

== See also ==
- Specimen banknote
- Pattern coin
- Test stamp
- Training stamp
- Dummy stamp
