= Postage stamp separation =

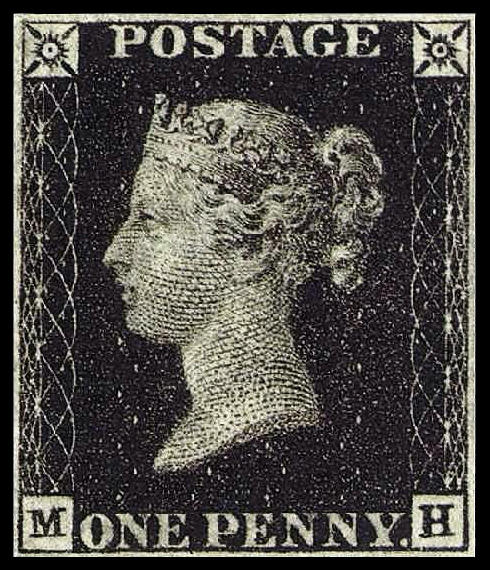
The Penny Black is imperforate.

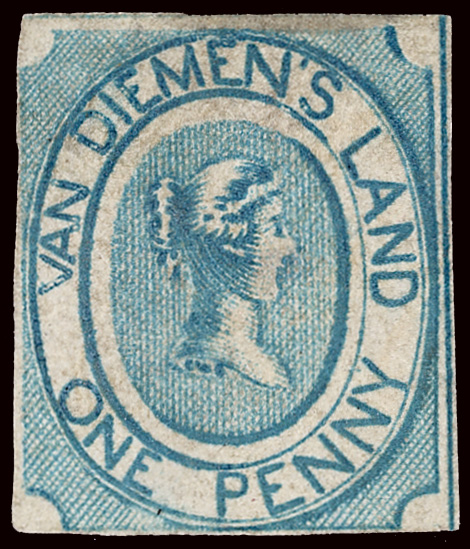
Separation of imperforate stamps by scissors, knife or tearing often leads to uneven margins on the stamp as in this 1853 stamp of Van Diemen's Land.

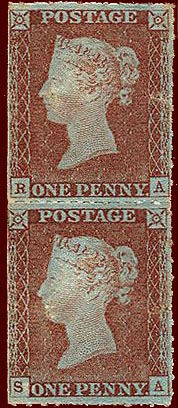
Vertical pair of 1d red, from Plate 70, perforated with the Archer experimental roulette

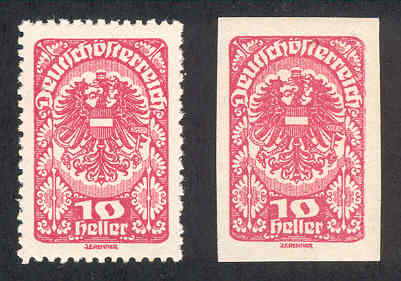
Perforated and imperforate versions of the same Austrian stamp of 1920

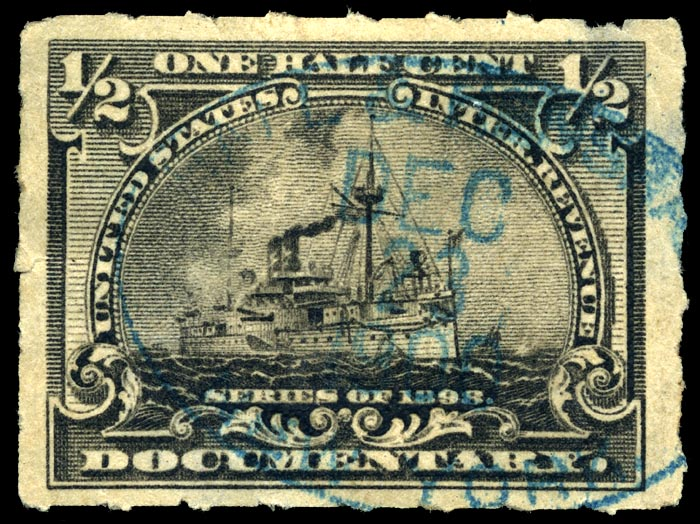
A rouletted United States revenue stamp of 1898

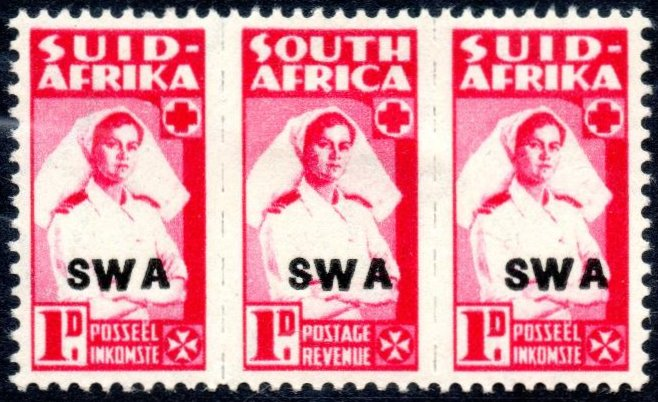
"Bantam" stamps from South West Africa showing normal and rouletted perforations. Three stamps could be printed using the paper normally used for one. Produced during World War II as an economy measure.

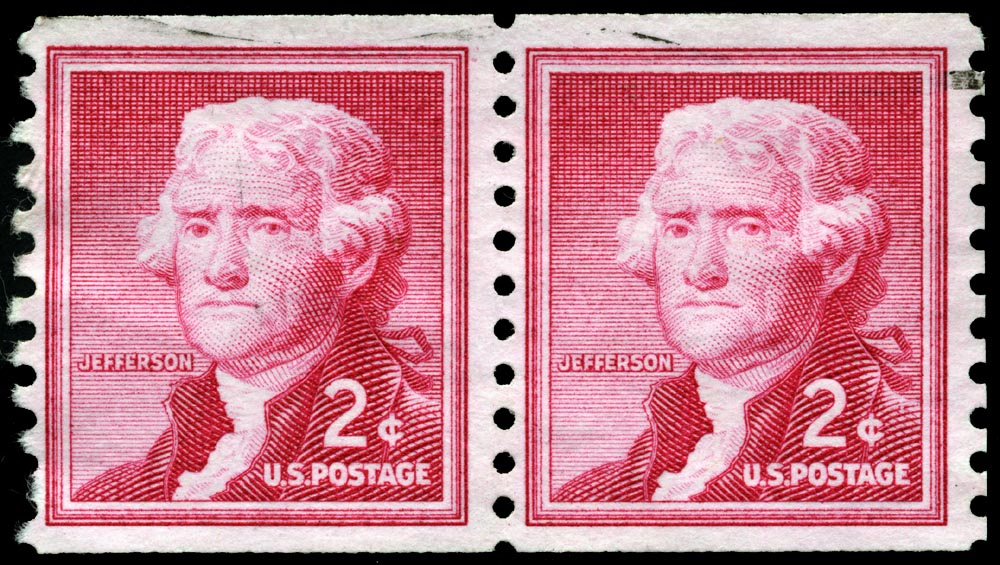
This pair of coil stamps clearly shows the pattern of perforation holes; also, on the left side of the pair, the stamp was torn, while on the right the perforations were cut with scissors or knife.

For postage stamps, separation is the means by which individual stamps are made easily detachable from each other.

Methods of separation include:

1. perforation: cutting rows and columns of small holes
2. rouletting: small horizontal and vertical cuts
3. diecutting: cut paper to shape using a metal die—used for self-adhesive stamps.

== Early years ==
In the early years, from 1840 until 1850, all stamps were issued imperforate, and had to be cut from the sheet with scissors or knife. This was time-consuming and error-prone (as mangled stamps of the era attest). Once reliable separation equipment became available, nations switched rapidly. Imperforate stamps have been issued occasionally since then, either because separation equipment was temporarily unavailable (in newborn nations for instance), to makers of automatic stamp vending equipment (the United States did this in the 1900s and 1910s), as novelties for stamp collectors (particularly when stamps are issued in souvenir sheets), or as errors.

== Henry Archer ==
In 1847, Henry Archer of the United Kingdom constructed the first (rouletting) machine, the "Archer Roulette", to separate stamps. His plan, submitted to the Postmaster General on 1 October 1847, was referred to the departments of the General Post Office and the Inland Revenue. Two such machines were built. After experimentation both machines proved to be failures. From one machine a few stamps from Plates 70 and 71 have survived. This machine consisted of lancet-shaped blades working on a fly-press principle and piercing the paper with a series of cuts.

Archer then abandoned this approach in favour of perforation, a process which used rows of small round pins to punch out the holes. In 1848 Archer patented his perforation machine which worked on the "stroke" principle. The arrangement of the pins enabled the top and sides of each stamp across the row to be perforated in a single operation, and this became known as "comb" perforation. Perforation trials were conducted in 1849 and 1850 under the auspices of the British Government and stamps from these trials were first issued towards the end of 1850. The Archer machine proved the viability of the process but never entered service. Archer's patent for his perforating machine (no. 12,340 of 1848, dated May 23, 1849) was purchased for £4,000 in June 1853. New machines based on Archer's principles were constructed by David Napier and Son Ltd; these were initially used in October 1853 for revenue stamps and from January 1854 for postage stamps.

== The rotary process ==
Also in 1854 a "rotary process" was patented by William Bemrose and Henry Howe Bemrose. The Bemrose machine was designed as a rouletting machine. As such, it proved impracticable for stamp separation but in 1856 was successfully converted to a perforating machine by George C. Howard of Toppan Carpenter, stamp printers for the American Government. Both the stroke and rotary processes have been refined since then, but are basically still the ones in use in the 21st century. The key decision for the perforator is the spacing of the holes; if too far apart, the stamps will not separate easily, and the stamps are likely to tear, but if too close, the stamps will tend to come apart in normal handling. In a few cases the size of the holes has been a factor. In the case of certain stamps produced by Australia for sale in rolls rather than sheets (coil stamps) a pattern can be seen on the stamp's short side of two small, ten large and two small holes.

== Measurement and variations ==
The standard for describing perforation is the number of holes (or the "teeth" or perfs of an individual stamp) in a 2-centimeter span. The finest gauge ever used is 18 on stamps of the Malay States in the early 1950s, and the coarsest is 2, seen on the 1891 stamps of Bhopal. Modern stamp perforations tend to range from 11 to 14.

Stamps that are perforated on one pair of opposite sides and imperforate on the other have most often been produced in coils instead of sheets, but they can sometimes come from booklet panes. Booklet panes can be associated with any combination of one, two or three imperforate sides. Sheet edges can produce any one imperforate side or two adjacent imperforate sides when the stamp comes from the corner of the sheet.

Variations include syncopated perforations which are uneven, either skipping a hole or by making some holes larger. In the 1990s, Great Britain began adding large elliptical holes to the perforations on each side, as an anti-counterfeiting measure.

== Rouletting ==
Rouletting uses small cuts in the paper instead of holes. It was used by a number of countries, but was rarely if ever seen on modern stamps until the die-cut serpentine roulette self-adhesive varieties appeared. Varieties, often described by philatelists in French terms, include straight cuts (percée en lignes, and percée en lignes colorées with inked cutting bar), arc (percée en arc), sewing-machine (perce en points), sawtooth and the serpentine roulettes (perce en serpentin) used by the early stamps of Finland. Because self-adhesive stamps contain a sticky layer, it is far easier to roulette the separations, than to actually punch out the holes for perforations.

A few types of stamps have combined rouletting and perforation, for instance South Africa in 1942.

== Self-adhesive stamps ==
The first self-adhesive stamp was issued by Sierra Leone in 1964, and by the 1990s these stamps came into wide use. These are inevitably diecut, meaning that the stamps themselves are cut entirely apart, held together only by the backing paper. At first the backing paper was itself solid, but in a repeat of history, is now slightly rouletted so as to facilitate tearing off blocks of stamps without having to remove them from the backing. Since the diecut goes all the way through the stamp, any shape will work, and the original self-adhesives were straight-edged. However, the tradition of perforation is so strong that more recent self-adhesives have a wavy diecut simulating the perforation. It can be recognized by studying the edge of the stamp closely; true perforations will have torn paper fibers on each tooth, while simulated perforations are smooth. From 2012 to 2016 the United States also sold small numbers of the stamps issued during this period in sheets without die cuts, thus creating imperforated varieties of them. Their issuance was very controversial.

== Collecting ==
For the stamp collector, perforations matter, not only as a way to distinguish different stamps (a perf 10 may be rarer and more valuable than a perf 11 of the same design), but also as part of the condition of stamps. Short or "nibbed" perfs are undesirable and reduce value, as are bent or creased perfs. Although the collector could count the number of holes using a ruler, the usual practice is to use a perforation gauge, which has preprinted patterns of holes in a selection of common perforations, requiring one merely to line up the stamp's perforations with the closest match. Rare stamps are often expertized in case they have been reperforated.

== Errors ==
As is inevitable for a mechanical process like perforation, many things can go wrong. "Blind perfs" are common, occurring when a hole is not completely punched out, as are off-center perfs that cut into the design of the stamp, sometimes very badly. Occasionally pairs or larger groups of stamps may be "imperforate between", meaning that they are not separated on all sides. Although it is very common to have different gauges of perforation horizontally and vertically, in rare circumstances a stamp may have different perforations on opposite sides; in the case of US stamps only a handful of these are known to exist. The various types of perforation errors are collectively known as "misperfs".

== See also ==
- Errors, freaks, and oddities
- Perfin – stamps perforated across the middle with letters or a pattern or monogram

== References and sources ==
Notes

Sources

- Williams, L.N. and M. Fundamentals of Philately (American Philatelic Society, 1990) Chap. 15 ISBN 0-933580-13-4
