= Red Mercury (newspaper stamp) =

Rare Austrian newspaper stamp

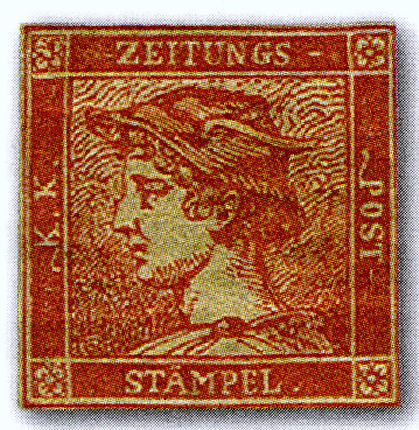
- Country of production: Austria
- Date of production: 1856
- Nature of rarity: Few exist
- No. in existence: unknown
- Face value: 6kr – 30 centesimi
- Estimated value: US $40,000

The Red Mercury—Zinnoberrote Merkur, lit. "vermilion Mercury"—is the rarest of Austrian newspaper stamps. It was issued for the mailing of newspapers in Austria and Lombardy-Venetia.

== History ==
Austria's newspaper stamps first appeared in 1851. They depicted a profile of Mercury, the Roman messenger god, and were not denominated, the color of the stamp indicating the value. Blue indicated the 6/10 kreuzer rate for one newspaper, yellow for ten newspapers (6 kr), and rose for 50 newspapers (30 kr). The higher denominations franked wrappers of bundles of newspapers and were frequently discarded.

In 1856 a red, or scarlet, stamp with the Mercury design, sold for six kreuzer - 30 centesimi to frank a bundle of 10 newspapers, was issued. However, it was soon superseded by a new design depicting Franz Joseph which came out in 1858, and only a few copies have survived.

== Valuations ==
An unused copy, without gum and short at the left side, was auctioned for 23,000 DM by Grobe & Lange in 1996. Recent auctions have valued it at about US$40,000. The 2005 Yvert catalog values it at €60,000 (75,000 if used).

On 7 February 2008 an unused copy was auctioned in Vienna for 26,000 euros.

An unused Red Mercury with original gum was auctioned for a hammer price of €40,000 plus commission, by Auktionhaus Felzmann in Düsseldorf on 5 November 2015.

== In cinema ==
Dekalog: Ten by Krzysztof Kieślowski features a quest to obtain a Red Mercury.

== References and sources ==
Sources

- Philatelic Gems 1 (Linn's, 1989)
