= Nicholas F. Seebeck =

Stamp dealer and printer

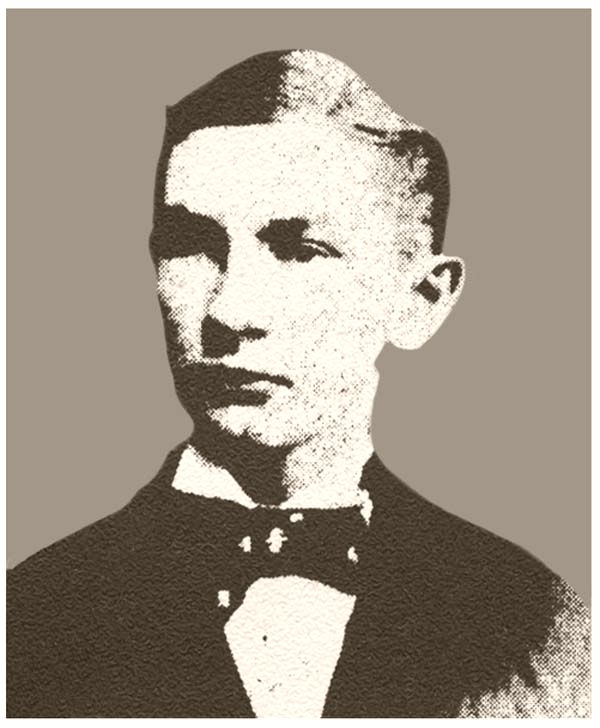
Nicholas Seebeck as a young man.

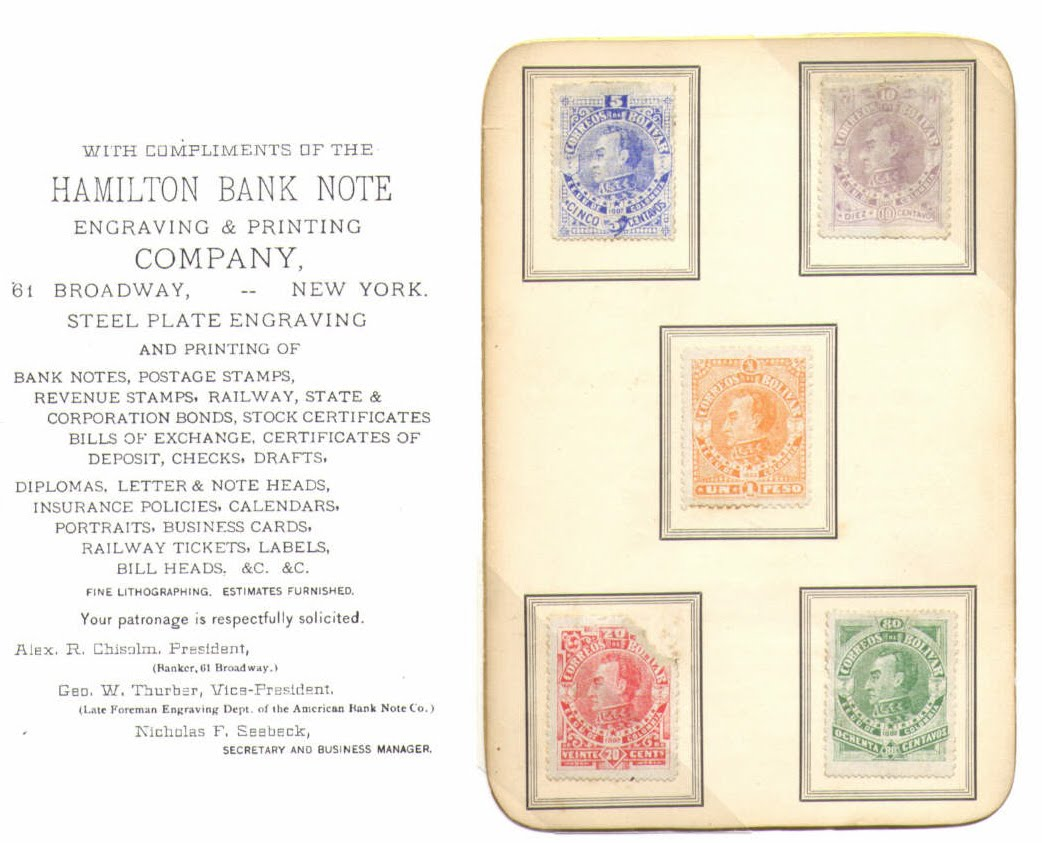
A printer's sample card for the Colombian state of Bolivar produced by the Hamilton Bank Note Company.

Nicholas Frederick Seebeck (1857 – June 23, 1899) was a stamp dealer and printer, best known for his stamp-printing contracts with several Latin American countries in the 1890s.

== Life in USA ==
Seebeck emigrated from what is now Germany to the United States at the age of 9. He soon established himself as a stamp dealer and cataloguer (as a sideline to owning a stationery and printing shop) in New York City, and published the Descriptive Price Catalogue of All Known Postage Stamps of the United States and Foreign Countries in 1876. In 1879, he began printing stamps for the Dominican Republic and the Colombian State of Bolivar. These stamps were printed under a standard sort of printing contract, where he received a fee for printing a specified number of stamps. However, with the Bolivar issues, he began the soon to be infamous practice of year-dating otherwise identical stamp designs. Seebeck was successful enough to be able to sell his business in 1884 and purchase a significant interest in the Hamilton Bank Note Engraving and Printing Co., whose main contract was for printing tickets for the New York City transportation system.

== Hamilton Bank Note Engraving and Printing Co ==
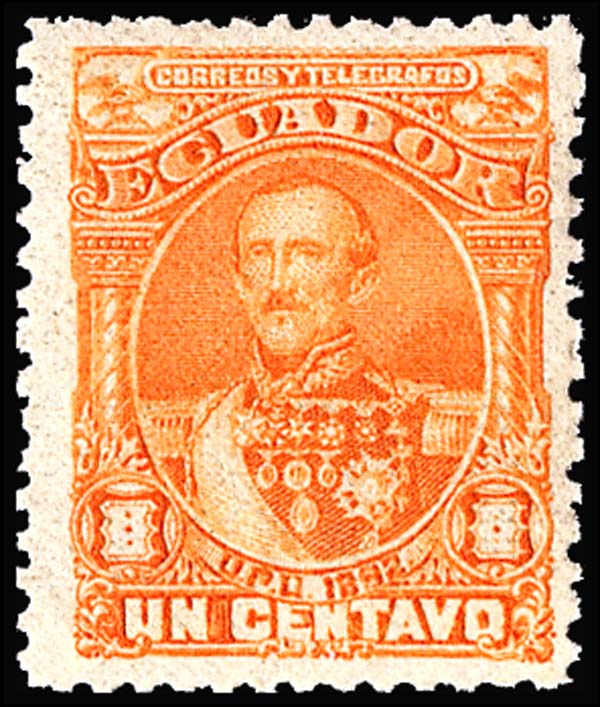
Ecuador, 1892 Issue, printed by Hamilton Bank Note Co. / Seebeck

Seebeck sold his New York stamp business in 1884 and used the money to buy into the Hamilton Bank Note Engraving and Printing Co. In 1889, Seebeck developed a novel plan for Hamilton to print stamps for foreign countries. He offered to supply the stamps for free, provided that:

1. The stamps would be dated and invalidated at the end of each year, to be replaced by a new series.
2. Unsold (invalid) stamps would be returned to Seebeck for sale to collectors.
3. Seebeck retained the right to reprint any invalid stamps as needed for sale to collectors.

Seebeck also apparently insisted on printing stamps with values not relevant to the postal rates of the countries using them. There are many long series of stamps where only a few values corresponded to common postal uses. The remaining values were intended for collectors. [This is open to debate for Honduras, Nicaragua and El Salvador. For Honduras and Nicaragua the following denomination paid these rates: 1c - local post card, 2c domestic post card, 5c domestic letter, 10c double domestic letter or foreign letter, 20c - double rate foreign letter or single foreign letter plus registration, 25c - single foreign letter plus registration plus Acknowledgement of Receipt, 30c - triple foreign letter rate, 40c - 4 times single foreign letter rate, 50c - 5 times foreign letter rate, 75c - 6 times foreign letter rate plus registration plus AR (at least one such cover is known to exist), 1 P - very heavy letters or packages. For El Salvador the following rates were paid: 1c - local card rate, 2c - domestic card rate, 3c - foreign card rate, 5c domestic letter rate, 10c single letter rate to Pacific rim countries, 11c - single foreign letter rate for letters transiting Panama, 12c, single letter rate to Pacific rim countries when the rate changed from 10c to 12c, 13c - single letter rate for via Panama when the rates went from 15c to 13c, 15c - single letter rate to transit Panama when the rates changed. 20c - double foreign letter rate for Pacific rim countries or single rate plus registration, 24c - double letter rate to Pacific rim countries, 25c - single foreign Pacific rim letter rate plus registration and AR, 26c double letter rate for via Panama when rate went from 15c to 13c, 30c - double foreign letter rate for transit by Panama when rates changed or single rate plus registration plus AP, 50c & 1 P - very heavy letter and packets. Except for Nicaragua where commercial letters bearing the 1P, 5P and 10P stamps are known, the 2P, 5P and 10P stamps were not used although a few compliance covers are known.]

Seebeck took advantage of a unique connection he had to Central America in that his brother-in-law Ernest Schernikow was the New York consul for El Salvador and Honduras. In 1889, Seebeck left for a tour of Central America with letters of introduction from Schernikow to talk with government officials about an idea for a stamp printing arrangement that would benefit all concerned and signed contracts in 1889–1890 with several countries: Ecuador, El Salvador, Guatemala (only for fiscal stamps not postage ones), Honduras, and Nicaragua. The contracts were for ten years worth of stamp issues, and also included official, telegraph, revenue stamps and postal stationery.

German philatelic experts who studied the Seebeck issues early in the 20th century claim that Seebeck, instead of reprinting after the stamps were demonetized had excess quantities printed before the stamps were delivered. Since these stamps were printed during the time they were valid for postage they are still considered original postage stamps, whether they were ever delivered to the respective countries' postal authorities or not.

Condemnation of Seebeck among the collecting community was nearly unanimous. Seebeck failed to realize that most stamp collectors want to collect the stamps that are actually usable and available for postage, and not special creations designed to separate them from their money. They objected strongly to Seebeck's unlimited reprinting rights, the needless yearly creation of new issues, and the issuance of postally-irrelevant stamp values. Stamps with face values up to $10 were issued for the 1892 Columbus anniversary. Although the U.S. and Canada received similar abuse for their 1892 and 1897 stamp series (which included values up to $5), Seebeck's efforts were seen as particularly blatant. Many collectors refused to collect these issues.

Several of the countries backed out of their contracts with Seebeck (Honduras in 1893, and Ecuador in 1896) due to the bad publicity and administrative nuisance of the frequently-changing issues.

Nicholas Seebeck died June 23, 1899, at the age of 42, in the final year of his contract with El Salvador.

== Legacy ==
The Hamilton Bank Note Company printed other stamps such as the 1902 issue of Dominican Republic and was still in existence in the 1940s when August Seebeck, Nicholas' grandson was president. However, millions of stamp reprints (and the plates from which they were produced) reached the market. Most of the Hamilton issues, pejoratively known as "Seebecks", are common and cheap to this day, at least in unused condition. However, many of the original post-1895 issues are scarce, or rare, in unused condition while the reprints abound. In part, this is because it is difficult to tell the stamps shipped for postal sale from the numerous reprints. Postally-used stamps are generally much less common, though the collector of this area needs to beware of forged cancellations.

== References and sources ==
Notes

Sources

- Minutes of the Hamilton Bank Note Company, by Bill Welch, The Seebecker, 1990
- The Seebeck Issues of Nicaragua, by Albert Quast & Dr. Robert Willer (ghostwritten by Joseph M. Sousa), The Collectors Club Philatelist, NY, 1968
- El Salvador - The Seebeck Stamps, Part 1 & 2, by Joseph D. Hahn and Joseph M. Sousa, The American Philatelic Congress Book, 1977 & 1978
- Destruction of the Seebeck Nicaraguan Dies, Transfer Rolls and Clichés, by Ernest A Kehr F.R.P.S.L.; The London Philatelist, No 711, pp. 22 – 24, February 1952
