= Henry Archer (railway enthusiast) =

Irish railway pioneer

Henry Archer (1799 – 2 March 1863) was the son of an Irish landowner. He attended Trinity College, Dublin. He was called to the Irish Bar and spent most of his time between North Wales and London.

== Ffestiniog Railway ==
In railway circles, Archer is known mostly for the Ffestiniog Railway, which was the major work of his life. He championed various Porth Dinllaen railway and harbour projects, though none came to fruition.

In 1829 Archer met Samuel Holland the owner of the Rhiwbryfdir slate mine at Blaenau Ffestiniog who was returning from Caernarfon. Holland had travelled between Caernarfon and Penygroes on the horse drawn Nantlle Railway which was seeking a purchaser. Holland discouraged Archer from buying the Nantlle and instead should build a railway from Ffestiniog to Porthmadog. Archer joined Holland in promoting the Ffestiniog Railway Company.

Archer became the managing director of the Ffestiniog company, and raised the initial capital of £24,185 largely on the Dublin Stock Exchange (including £11,905 of his own money). He helped steer the bill through Parliament and managed the construction of the railway. Archer quarrelled with his fellow directors, the Oakeley Estate and with James Spooner and was less active in company affairs after the railway opened. In 1836 he sued the FR company for his salary and received a substantial settlement. He remained as managing director until 1856 and a company director until 1860.

== Philately ==
Philatelists know Henry Archer as the inventor of the first postage stamp perforating machine, which he patented in 1848, to facilitate stamp separation. Following the successful Prince Consort Essay trials in 1853, he sold his copyright and patents to the Postmaster General for £4,000. In early trials, his alternative Archer Roulette machines failed to work well.

Archer died at Pau, Pyrénées-Atlantiques, France on 2 March 1863.
