= Round file =

Round file may refer to:

- A tool, a type of file, used to cut fine amounts of material from a work piece and also known as a rat-tail file
- Slang for a waste container or File 13
