= Postage meter =

Machine for printing proof of postage payment

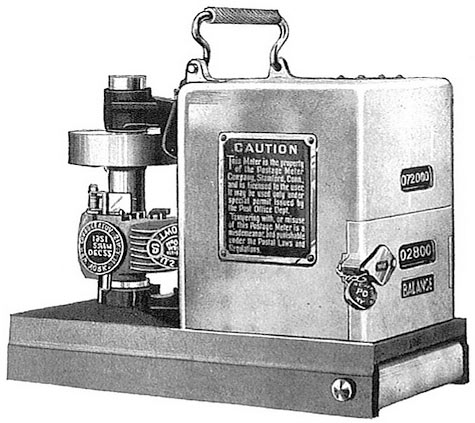
The Pitney Bowes Model M postage meter 1920

A postage meter or franking machine is a mechanical device used to create and apply physical evidence of postage (or franking) to mailed items. Postage meters are regulated by a country's postal authority. A postage meter imprints an amount of postage, functioning as a postage stamp, a cancellation and a dated postmark all in one. The meter stamp serves as proof of payment and eliminates the need for adhesive stamps.

== History ==
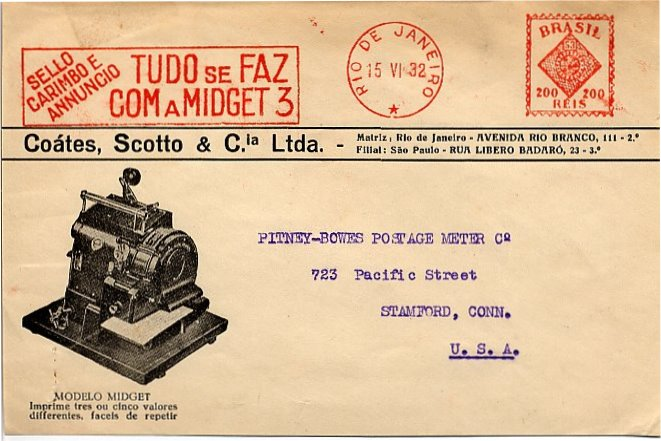
An early machine pictured on a 1932 envelope from Brazil addressed to Pitney Bowes

Since the issuance of adhesive stamps in 1840, postal officials have been concerned about security against stamp theft and how to process mail in a timely fashion. One solution was a postage stamp affixing machine, introduced in the 1880s.

The earliest record of a franking machine was by Frenchman Carle Bushe who in 1884 obtained a British Patent for a device that would print a stamp on an envelope and record postage via a counting device. However, Bushe's device is not known to have existed, and the idea was not pursued. The first franking machine known to have been placed into use was a coin operated machine invented by Charles A. Kahrs. It was installed in the lobby of the General Post Office in Christiana, Norway, on August 24, 1900, but was removed in December that same year.

Working independently, a young Chicago inventor, Arthur Pitney, obtained his first mailing system patent in 1902. Shortly after, he formed the Pitney Postal Machine Company, which became the American Postage Meter Company in 1912. Pitney's first machine consisted of a manual crank, chain action, printing die, counter, and lockout device.

Pitney's company (and its various partners) directly rivalled Edwards Franks' Franking Company of America which was founded in 1911. Franks' company manufactured and distributed a machine much like the one Franks had presented in 1886 at the Worlds Fair. However, the machinations had been streamlined and controls simplified for ease of use. Sales to small and large businesses were good for both Franks' company and the Pitney Postal Machine Company.

In 1919, Pitney joined forces with Walter Bowes, an entrepreneur who had achieved prominence in postal circles through his company, the Universal Stamping Machine Company, which manufactured post office canceling machines. In 1920, the two companies merged to create the Pitney-Bowes Postage Meter Company. In 1926, PBPM Co. (as it was then known) merged with Edward Franks' Franking Company of America and was consolidated and renamed as the Franks Universal Postage Company, or sometimes referred to as The Universal Postage Trust.

In the 1930s Franks Universal entered the European postage market through a partnership with Albert H. Girling (founder of Girling Ltd, a brake manufacturing company) which saw them trade as Franks Consolidated Postage. This investment's success allowed Franks and business partner, Girling, to enter into other postage markets around the world.

The year 1938 continued to be turbulent for Franks, as Franks Universal came under investigation for breaches of the Sherman Antitrust Act, much like the tobacco and oil industries had experienced previously. The trust was dissolved and the assets were split among four companies: Wright Post, Evans Roberts Godkin Inc, Franks-Girling Universal Postage, and Pitney-Bowes Co.

The Model M Postage Meter was authorized on September 1, 1920, and was put into commercial use in Stamford later that year. (In 1986, the American Society of Mechanical Engineers designated the Model M as an International Historic Mechanical Engineering Landmark.)

== Function ==
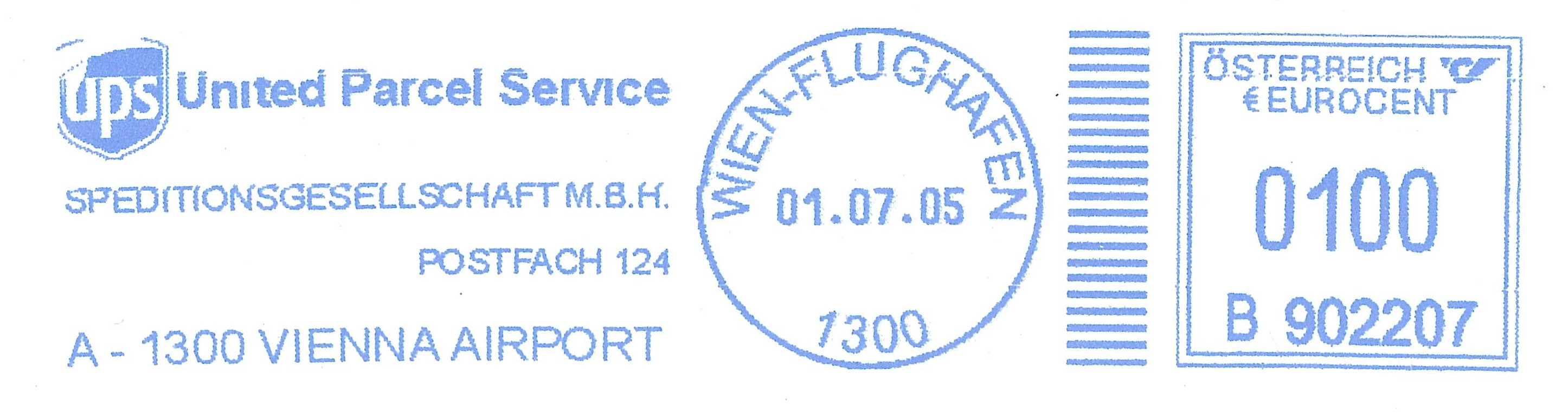
The meter stamp created by a modern franking machine

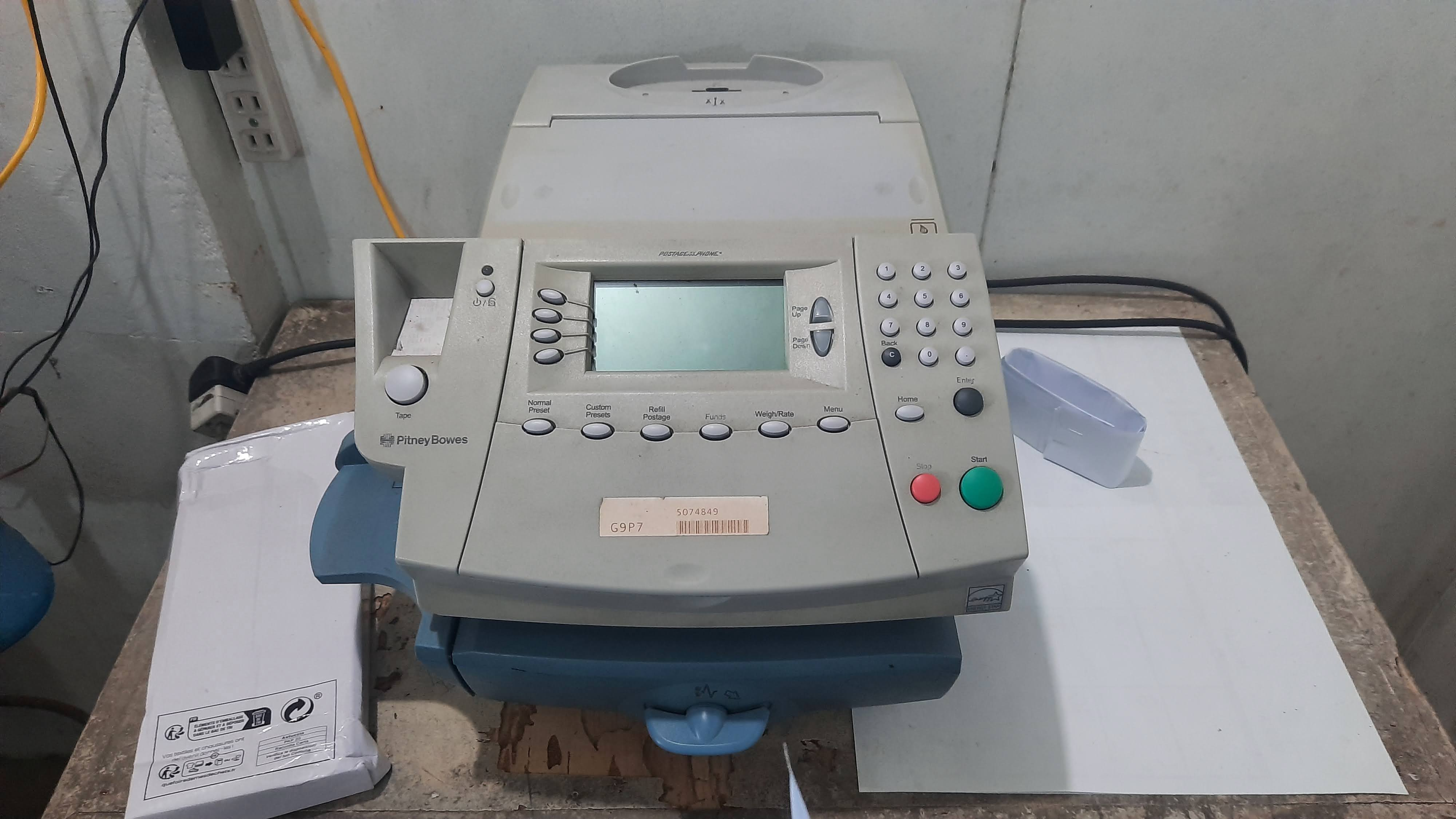
Modern Pitney Bowes franking machine

The postage meter normally consists of a keyboard for entering the postage, three seals, and a stamping mechanism. Years ago, users needed to take their meter to a postal office in order to add additional postage (sometimes called a "reset" or "refill"). That changed in 1979 when Pitney Bowes invented remote meter resetting, otherwise known as Postage by Phone. Today, users can add to their postage balance by telephone, prepaid cards, via the web or through a direct connection over the Internet. The first counter shows the remaining balance. The second counter shows the total postage of the franked consignments. The third one counts the number of prints and is for statistic purposes only.

If the integrated scales are disabled, the postage has to be entered manually via the keyboard. Otherwise the machine calculates the postage regarding the dimensions and the weight of the consignment. Afterwards the letters are automatically run through an aperture, which is limited to the largest allowed dimensions, and the postage is imprinted. The balance-counter subtracts the imprinted value from the balance, the counter of the total adds the same value, and the printing-counter adds one. If the desired postage is no longer topped up, imprinting is denied. After running through, the consignment arrives at the collect pan orientated "postmark up/front". For thicker consignments there are peelable postage strips, which are manually inserted into the machine via an entry on the side.

== Types of meters ==
=== Mechanical, manual and rotary-print head meters ===
Mechanical meters are letterpress meters that had to be taken to the post office and physically reset by a postal official. These meters were decertified and taken out of circulation by the USPS in 1999.

Manual Set and Rotary Print Head meters were decertified by the USPS in 2008. While more advanced, including remote meter resetting capabilities, this early technology was deemed susceptible to tampering.

=== Digital meters ===
With Digital Print Meters, postage is added either through a telephone modem or through a network connection to the internet. The telephone connection option is gradually being phased out. Postage is printed through an inkjet cartridge using special postage ink. The most advanced systems print Information Based Indicia (IBI), a two-dimensional Data Matrix or bar code combined with visually identifiable characters and symbols. The data matrix contains such information as amount of postage, origin zip code, destination, mail class, weight, and confirmation/tracking numbers. Examples include: USPS Intelligent Mail barcode, Royal Mail Mailmark and Canada Post Postal Indicia.

There are a number of companies offering postage meters, also called franking machines.

=== Internet- and stamp-based meters ===
While most mailers use mailing systems, new technologies are making metered mail accessible to even the smallest of businesses.

eBay and PayPal users can print labels with postage using eBay's online postage solution and pay using their PayPal account. This technology, powered by Pitney Bowes, provides for a completely browser-based online postage solution.

Other technologies allow the user to print postage from a computer, or from small stamp printers. In the first consumer application for postage meters, customized stamps are also possible.

In 1999, Stamps.com became the first organization to be licensed by the United States Postal Service to print valid postage from a traditional PC printer. Their system allows the user to automatically download and print postage directly onto an envelope or "Netstamp".

=== Mailing system components ===
A postage meter is only one component of a mailing system. Other elements include:

- Base (the hardware on which the postage meter sits)
- Feeder (sends envelopes through the meter)
- Postage scale (which weighs postage)
- Sealer (moistens the flaps of envelopes)
- Stacker (stacks envelopes)
- Tape dispenser (when postage cannot be printed directly on the mail piece)

For high-volume mailers, a postage meter may also be incorporated into an inserting system which prepares mail end-to-end.

== See also ==
- Meter stamp
  - Neopost web-enabled stamps
