= GreatSchools =

American school-information organization

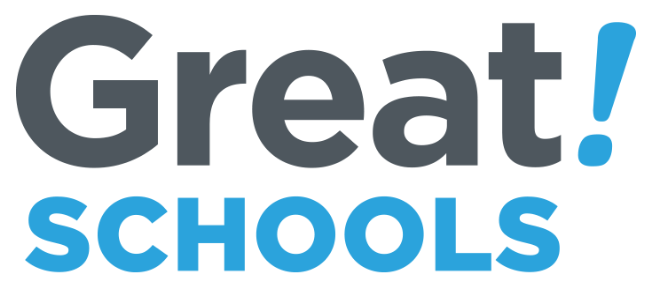
- Formation: 1998
- Type: Nonprofit organization
- Location: Oakland, California, U.S.
- Leader: Jon Deane
- Key people: Bill Jackson, Founder; Jon Deane, CEO
- Employees: 35
- Website: greatschools.org

GreatSchools is an American national nonprofit organization that provides information about PK-12 schools and education. The website provides ratings and comparison tools based on student growth, college readiness, equity, and test scores for public schools in the U.S. As of July 2017, the GreatSchools database contains information for more than 138,000 public, private, and charter schools in the United States.

== History ==
GreatSchools was founded in 1998 as a school directory and parenting resource in Santa Clara County, with seed funding from New Schools Venture Fund. The next four years (1999–2002), the school ratings expanded statewide in California and expanded nationwide in 2003. In 2008–2011 the College Bound Program was launched, funded by the Bill & Melinda Gates Foundation, the Robertson Foundation, and the Walton Family Foundation. In 2013, GreatSchools received a three-year grant from the Walton Family Foundation and saw Zillow integrate GreatSchools information such as school search, school ratings and reviews into their real estate database. In 2014, there was an expanded partnership with Maponics.

== Recognition and awards ==
- GreatSchools received Outstanding Achievement awards in 2011 and Best In Class awards in 2009 from the Interactive Media Awards.
- In 2021, GreatSchools received two nominations in the 25th Annual Webby Awards in the Science & Education category for its parenting podcast, Like a Sponge: Best Limited Series Podcast and Best Individual Episode for its season 2, episode 4 title, "Liar, Liar: How to Raise an Honest Child in a Post-truth Society."
- In 2021, GreatSchools.org won two "Awards of Distinction" in the 27th Annual Communicator Awards for Best Family & Parenting and Best Education website.
- In 2022, an episode of GreatSchools.org's podcast Like a Sponge, "Banishing Bias from School]," was nominated in the 26th Annual Webby Awards for Best Science & Education podcast episode. The podcast series Like a Sponge was also recognized as a Webby Honoree for Best Podcast - Limited-Series & Specials in the Health, Science & Education category.

== Equity and Student Progress ratings update ==
In 2017, GreatSchools introduced a "Summary Rating" to individual school profiles. The Summary Rating is a score on a 1-10 scale composed of themed ratings including how well schools serve students from different racial, ethnic, and socioeconomic backgrounds (Equity), how much students are improving within a school year (Student Progress), performance on state tests (Test Score), and how well schools prepare students for college (College Readiness). In 2020, GreatSchools further evolved its Equity and Summary Ratings for K-12 schools to emphasize equity and elevate student academic progress as a key measure of school quality. The ratings also factor student progress — or growth — into its methodology.

The increased emphasis on equity had the effect of lowering the summary scores for many highly-rated schools and raising ratings for poorly performing schools, as schools with a small population of disadvantaged students do not receive an Equity rating. GreatSchools ratings also do not take college level courses other than Advanced Placement into consideration when calculating "college readiness." As a result, high schools with the International Baccalaureate (IB) Program or Cambridge Program score lower on this criterion, which gives an artificially lower overall school score.

Despite these adjustments to the methodology, the ratings continue to generate criticism among parents and education stakeholders for their role in housing choices and reliance on indicators known to be associated with student race and income. For example, real-estate websites like Zillow and Redfin allow for prospective homeowners to filter their searches based on school quality. The controversy surrounding the link between school quality and housing choices centers on the fact that public schools are largely funded by property income taxes. High quality schools raise home value, and higher home value means more money being put into the schools. On the other hand, low-valued property leads to less funding for schools, which then further decreases property value.

== Addition of school climate data ==
In August 2021, GreatSchools became the first school information site to add school climate data to its school profiles. GreatSchools first piloted the publication of these data in Illinois using responses from the Illinois State Board of Education's 5Essentials Survey, an evidence-based system designed to drive improvement in schools nationwide. This survey has been validated by the University of Chicago Consortium on School Research and shown to predict the likelihood of school improvement in school climate and student outcomes. GreatSchools awarded 452 Illinois public schools — 66% of which serve a high percentage of students from low-income families — its inaugural Thrive Award, which was based on schools achieving a designated threshold of success across the five areas of the 5Essentials Survey and therefore indicating they are "well-organized for improvement."

In December 2021, GreatSchools added school climate data to its profiles of more than 1,700 schools within the New York City Department of Education. The data was sourced from the Department's annual NYC School Survey, which asks families, students, and teachers to reflect on six components of a strong school culture: instruction, environment, teachers, school leadership, family-community ties, and trust.

== National and local data partnerships ==
GreatSchools has partnered with a number of national and local organizations to add new information to school profiles and connect parents of differing socioeconomic groups with its school quality information. Data partnerships include:

- AffordableHousing.com (formerly GoSection8.com) to add school quality data to the site's housing listings, which service recipients of the federal Housing Choice Voucher Program.
- College Board to add Advanced Placement (AP) course listings to GreatSchools' profiles of public high school in the U.S.
- Cambridge Assessment International Education to display on GreatSchools profiles schools that offer the internationally-recognized learning program.
- Project Lead The Way to denote which PreK-12 schools offer a STEM curriculum.
- International Baccalaureate to add IB programs to GreatSchools' elementary, middle, and high school profiles.
