= Bin bug =

Device monitoring household waste creation

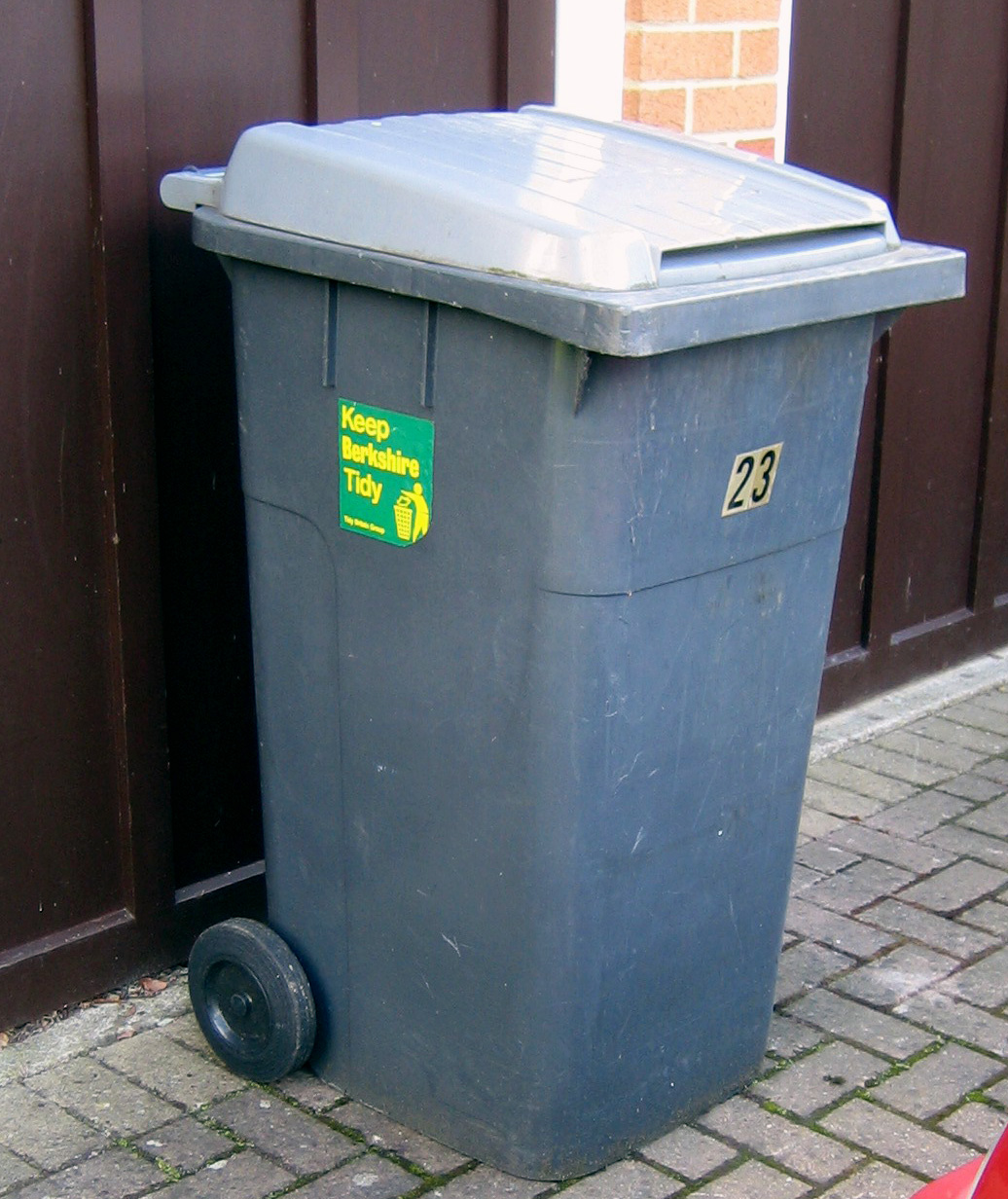
The bin bugs can only be attached to wheelie bins, which not all British households currently possess.

The term "bin bug" was coined in August 2006 by the British media to refer to the use of Radio Frequency Identification (RFID) chips by some local councils to monitor the amount of domestic waste created by each household. The system works by having a unique RFID chip for each household's non-recycling wheelie bin (such households have two bins: one for general waste and one recycling bin). The chip is scanned by the dustbin lorry and, as it lifts the bin, records the weight of the contents. This is then stored in a central database that monitors the non-recycled waste output of each household.

== History ==
In August 2006, it was reported that five Ulster councils had installed chips in household wheelie bins, and that three more local councils were about to trial the technology. Paul Bettison, the chairman of the Local Government Association's environment board, said that if pilot schemes received approval from the government and were successful, weighing schemes could be commonplace across the country within two years. While some councils informed the householders of their intentions to monitor their waste output many others did not. Worcester City Council, for example, detailed their plans through local newspaper Worcester News in August 2005. Aberdeen City Council kept the scheme quiet until a local newspaper ran the story; the council declared no intention to operate or bring the system online but did not rule out future use. Some councillors said that the purpose of the "bin bugs" was to settle disputes about the ownership of the bins, but others mentioned that the system is a trial and means that they are more prepared should the government introduce a household waste tax. The tax would be in the form of a charge for households that exceed set limits of non-recycled waste. With recycling in the UK amongst the lowest percentage in Europe at 18%, a new tax scheme would have the intention of encouraging domestic recycling and meeting European landfill reduction targets.

Each RFID chip costs around £2, with each scanning system costing around £15,000. The Local Government Association (LGA) provided £5 million to councils to fund 40 pilot schemes. They are supplied by two rival German companies: Sulo and Deister Electronic. Mr Bettison said that although removing a device from a bin "would not break any law", in the future a local authority might have grounds to refuse to empty the bin.

More recently, the usage of RFID chips on trash bins has been suggested for an Internet-of-things improvement and automation of waste collection. It could allow the monitoring of waste levels and the optimization of routes.

== European directives ==
The motivation behind the RFID chips are to monitor the production of landfill waste so that councils can comply with the European Landfill Directive 1999/31/EC. The standard regulating RFID tags for the waste industry is EN 14803 Identification and/or determination of the quantity of waste.

== Removing the bug ==
The RFID tag is located in a recess under the front lip of the bin, either as a self-contained unit or behind a plastic cap.

There is some debate as to the legality of removing the RFID chip.
