= Pitney Bowes =

American technology company

Pitney Bowes Inc.
- Formerly: Pitney Bowes Postage Meter Company
- Type: Public
- Traded as: NYSE: PBI; S&P 600 Component
- Industry: Business services
- Founded: April 23, 1920; 106 years ago
- Founders: Arthur Pitney; Walter Bowes
- Headquarters: 27 Waterview Drive, Shelton, Connecticut, United States
- Key people: Kurt Wolf (president, CEO); Paul Evans (Executive VP, CFO))
- Services: Shipping; Mailing; Financial services
- Revenue: ▼US$1.89 billion (2025)
- Net income: ▲US$145 million (2025)
- Number of employees: 7,200 (2024)
- Website: pitneybowes.com

Pitney Bowes Inc. is an American technology company most known for its postage meters and other mailing equipment, services, and other technologies. The company was founded by Arthur Pitney, who invented the first commercially available postage meter, and Walter Bowes as the Pitney Bowes Postage Meter Company on April 23, 1920.

The company provides services of the mailing, shipping, and financial varieties to approximately 750,000 customers globally, as of 2021. Pitney Bowes is a certified "work-share partner" of the United States Postal Service, and helps the agency sort and process 15 billion pieces of mail annually. Pitney Bowes has also commissioned surveys related to international e-commerce. The company formerly produced copier and fax machines until this business was spun off in 2001 under Imagistics International.

Pitney Bowes is based in Stamford, Connecticut, and as of December 2024 employed approximately 7,200 employees, about 78% of whom were located in the United States. During 2018 Pitney Bowes along with 90 additional Fortune 500 companies "paid an effective federal tax rate of 0% or less" as a result of Donald Trump's Tax Cuts and Jobs Act of 2017.

== History ==
Former logo used from 1971 to 2015

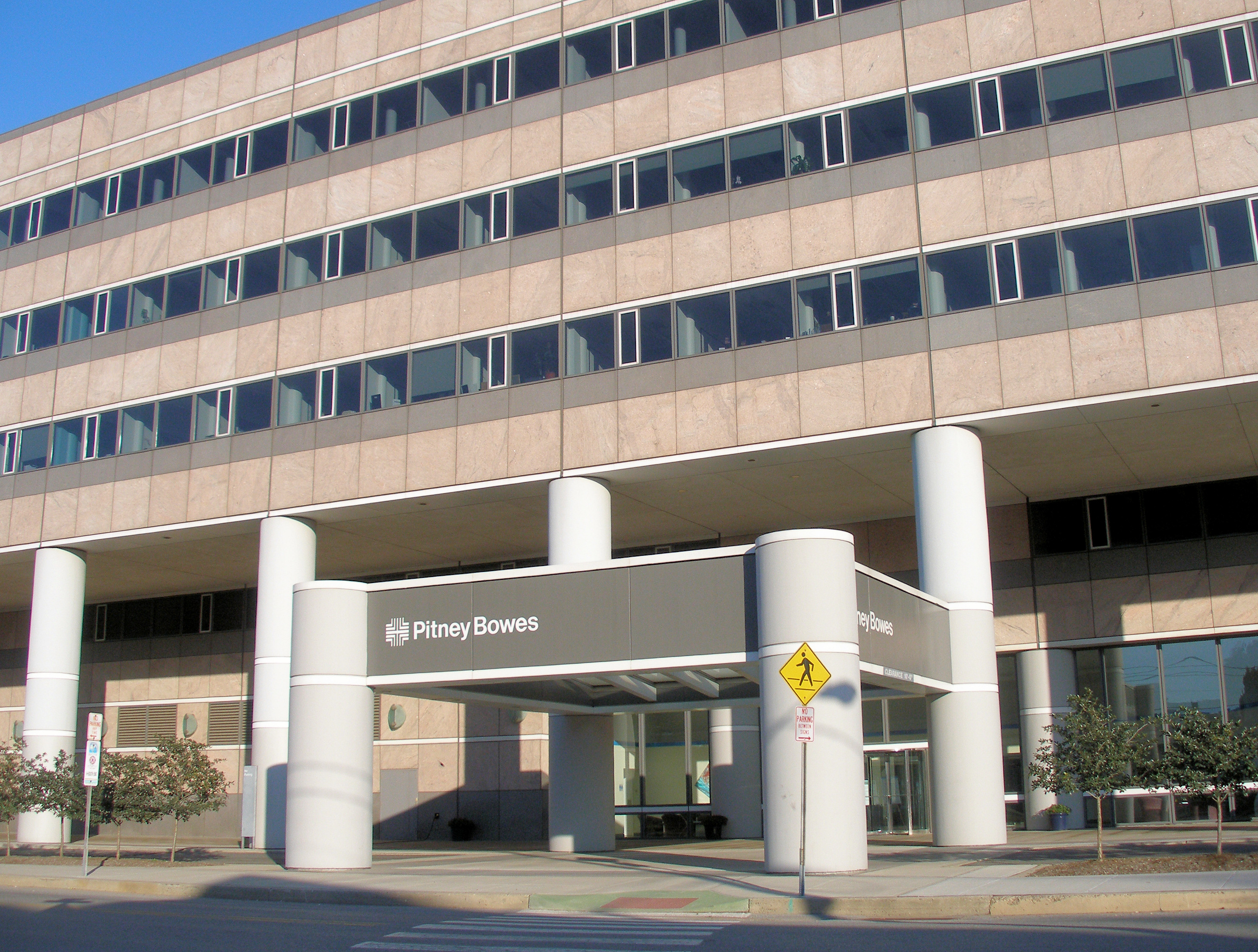
Former Pitney Bowes headquarters in Stamford

In 1902, Arthur Pitney patented his first "double-locking" hand-cranked postage-stamping machine, and with patent attorney Eugene A. Rummler, founded the Pitney Postal Machine Company. In 1908, English emigrant and founder of the Universal Stamping Machine Company Walter Bowes began providing stamp-canceling machines to the United States Post Office Department. Bowes moved his operations to Stamford in 1917. These two companies merged to form the Pitney Bowes Postage Meter Company in 1920 with the invention of the first commercially available postage meter.

The company created its first logo, which symbolized "the security of the metered mail system", in 1930. In 1950, Pitney Bowes initiated an advertising campaign in national publications with the message, "Metered mail makes the mailer's life easier". In 1971, the company introduced a new logo, which represented the "intersection of paper-based and electronic communication". Pitney Bowes was valued at around $18 billion in December 1998.

In April 2003, Pitney Bowes filed a lawsuit in Seattle's King County Superior Court against Mark Browne and Howard Gray, who founded the competing company Nexxpost in 2002, as well as six other former employees, for engaging "in transgressions ranging from misappropriation of trade secrets to violating confidentiality agreements". The two companies reached a settlement in August 2003.

By 2005, the company employed 32,500 people and the next year reported $5.7 billion in annual revenue and more than 35,000 employees. In 2008, in conjunction with other companies, Pitney Bowes donated two of its 3,400 patents to the Eco-Patent Commons, which is operated by the World Business Council for Sustainable Development, in an effort to reduce pollution. One of the patents increases the lifespan of electronic scales, reducing landfill waste, and the other is an inkjet printing technology that reduces ink use. In 2009, Pitney Bowes was named one of the world's largest software companies by Software Magazine and in December it opened its first customer innovation center in Shelton, Connecticut.

In February 2012, the credit rating for Pitney Bowes International Holdings was lowered by Fitch Ratings from BBB+ to BBB. The ratings agency said its main concern was "the downward trajectory" of Pitney Bowes' revenue, and added that they have a "negative outlook." The company sold its I.M. Pei & Partners-designed headquarters in Stamford for nearly $40 million in 2013, and relocated to a new, smaller headquarters in the city. According to the Hartford Courant, Pitney Bowes was eligible to receive as much as $27 million in subsidies over five years as part of the state's "First Five" program, for keeping 1,600 employees and adding 200 more. In March 2014, Moody's Investors Service assigned a long-term rating of Baa2 to the company's proposed $350 million senior unsecured notes (due 2024) and reiterated their stable outlook on Pitney Bowes.

In 2014, the company announced plans for a rebrand. Pitney Bowes unveiled its new logo in January 2015, replacing one used since 1971; the rebranding campaign, which included an updated Web site and marketing, reportedly cost between $40 million and $80 million.

Pitney Bowes' 2015 profits totaled $408 million, but this declined to $95 million in profits for 2016. The company's revenues also decreased 5% from 2015 to 2016 when it reported $3.4 billion in revenue. By the end of 2016 it had 15,700 employees. Pitney Bowes' executives said the declines were caused by "the changeover to a new U.S. enterprise-business platform—a change that disrupted short-term business, but one they have said would significantly improve the company's long-term operations."

In 2016, the company launched its first television advertising campaign in nearly twenty years; "Craftsmen of Commerce" cost $20 million and included three advertisements for national news and sports networks.

In March 2017, Pitney Bowes left the S&P 500 index, having been listed since the index was established in 1957, and joined the S&P 400. The company focused increasingly on e-commerce related services in the late 2010s. This area of its business grew during the COVID-19 pandemic, and it opened three e-commerce service centers in Baltimore, Orlando and Oakland in 2020. During 2018 Pitney Bowes along with 90 additional Fortune 500 companies "paid an effective federal tax rate of 0% or less" as a result of Donald Trump´s Tax Cuts and Jobs Act of 2017.

=== Acquisitions, investment, and divestitures ===
In 1995, Pitney Bowes sold Dictaphone Corp., which produced communication and dictation recording systems, to an affiliate of the investment group Stonington Partners Inc. for $450 million. Imagistics International was spun-off from Pitney Bowes' copier and fax business in 2001.

Since 2001, Pitney Bowes has spent $1 billion on acquisitions. In 2001, Bell & Howell sold its international Mail and Messaging Technologies business to Pitney Bowes. Pitney Bowes also acquired Danka Services International (part of Danka Business Systems PLC) for $290 million in cash, and the French postage meter company Secap. In 2002, Pitney Bowes acquired the Omaha, Nebraska mail presorting company PSI Group for $130 million, followed by the Landover, Maryland-based DDD Company, which developed mail and messenger services, for $49.5 million in 2003.

In 2004, Pitney Bowes acquired the Lanham, Maryland-based company Group 1 Software, which develops mailing technology, for $380 million, as well as International Mail Express for $29 million. In February 2005, Pitney Bowes completed transactions in Brazil and India, expanding into both markets for the first time. In Brazil, the company partnered with Semco Participacoes to form Pitney Bowes Semco Equipamentos e Servicos, offering mailing equipment, production mail, and software services. Pitney Bowes acquired the mailing division of Kilburn Office Automation Limited, forming the New Delhi-based Pitney Bowes India. Pitney Bowes acquired the litigation support services provider Compulit Inc. one month later, creating Pitney Bowes Legal Solutions. Pitney Bowes purchased the marketing services company Imagitas in 2005 for $230 million in stock, which was sold to Red Ventures in 2015.

The company spun-off Capital Services in 2005 to New York private-equity group Cerberus Capital Management. Pitney Bowes acquired multiple companies in 2006, including Emtex and its output management software for $41 million, and the Providence, Rhode Island-based company Ibis Consulting, Inc., which provides electronic discovery services, for nearly $67 million. The company also acquired Advertising Audit Service, PMH Caramanning, and the Bellevue, Washington-based company Print Inc., which provides print management solutions.

In 2007, Pitney Bowes acquired MapInfo Corporation and its location intelligence solutions. The company moved out of MapInfo's building in North Greenbush, New York's Rensselaer Technology Park, and into other offices within the science park. Pitney Bowes also acquired the Toronto-based customer relationship management services company Digital Cement for nearly $40 million in cash.

The British software development company Portrait Software was acquired by Pitney Bowes in 2010 for nearly $64.8 million in cash. Pitney Bowes sold its management services division to Apollo Global Management in 2013 for $400 million.

In May 2015, Pitney Bowes acquired the online shopping services provider Borderfree for about $395 million. Borderfree was founded in Israel in 1999 initially as a forex conversion site for retailers and subsequently pivoted its business to providing cross-border e-commerce solutions for US retailers.

The company also acquired the cloud-based software developer Enroute Systems Corp. for an undisclosed amount, followed by the presort services provider Zip Mail Services.

In mid-2016, Pitney Bowes acquired Maponics, which provides "geospatial boundary and contextual data", for an undisclosed amount. In February 2017, the company acquired the Naperville, Illinois-based mailing solutions company ProSORT for an undisclosed amount. Pitney Bowes merged its Des Plaines operating center into a larger Naperville facility.

In September 2017, Pitney Bowes acquired Newgistics, an Austin-based e-commerce and retail logistics company, for $475 million, with the stated aim of "accelerating Pitney Bowes' expansion into the U.S. domestic parcels market." Following the acquisition, Newgistics CEO Todd Everett (who joined the company in 2005 as Director of Operations and was named CEO in 2015) continued to lead Newgistics within Pitney Bowes' corporate framework.

In mid 2018, Pitney Bowes' Document Messaging Technologies (DMT) division was acquired by Platinum Equity in exchange for $361 million, and the newly acquired business was re-branded as BlueCrest.

In August 2019, Syncsort announced plans to acquire Pitney Bowes' software solutions business for approximately $700 million. The transaction was completed in December 2019.

In August 2022, Pitney Bowes announced it would test automated delivery trucks from startup Gatik for short hauls by supplementing existing routes in the Dallas, Texas, area.

In August 2024, Pitney Bowes announced it would start exiting its global e-commerce business via a sale. The meant the company would start focusing on two product lines: SendTech and Presort.

=== Leadership ===
In May 2025, the board appointed director Kurt Wolf as president and chief executive officer. Milena Alberti-Perez has served as non-executive chair of the board since October 2024. In July 2025, former director Paul Evans was appointed executive vice president, chief financial officer and treasurer. Former executive vice president and chief innovation officer James A. Fairweather departed the company effective April 1, 2025.

Former CEOs include Murray D. Martin, who served from 2007 to 2012, and Michael J. Critelli, who served as chairman and chief executive for ten years. Other previous CEOs included: George Harvey, Fred Allen, John Nicklis, Harry Nordberg, and Walter Wheeler.

== Products and services ==
=== Current products and services ===
The company announced the launch of a single platform incorporating tools and services such as shipping, tracking, payments and marketing for global e-commerce businesses in 2017. By 2020, Pitney Bowes' largest business area was parcel processing for e-commerce; its processing centers handle package delivery and returns, working with USPS and private delivery companies to ship the packages. The company's e-commerce service managed parcel shipping and returns for approximately 600 retailers globally, as of 2020. It uses technology from third party providers for cloud computing, database management and application programming interfaces, to allow communication between the systems used by retailers and parcel carriers.

As of 2021, Pitney Bowes continued to provide commercial clients with postal meters and mail presorting services. Its Presort Services business for enterprise companies processes approximately 17 billions of pieces of mail annually. The company handles commercial mailing and shipping via its SendTech services. Pitney Bowes released its SendPro300 product in October 2016, and launched its SendPro C Series in September 2017. In addition to postage meters, such as the company's SendPro Mailstation, it provides an online SendPro tool for calculating and paying for postage, and printing shipping labels and stamps.

The company established its financial services business in the late 1970s, initially for customers leasing its postage meters and later to provide financing for customers to buy its equipment. In March 2019, Pitney Bowes launched the subsidiary Wheeler Financial to provide equipment financing to small and medium businesses. The company's financial services also include a state chartered bank, based in Salt Lake City, that its clients use for purchasing U.S. postage.

The company publishes an annual report on parcel shipping volume and spending, called the Pitney Bowes Parcel Shipping Index. The index includes data from 13 countries: Australia, Brazil, Canada, China, France, Germany, India, Italy, Japan, Norway, Sweden, the United Kingdom and the United States.

=== Historical products and services ===
Pitney Bowes introduced the Model M Postage Meter, which was authorized by the United States Postal Service on September 1, 1920. The company released the first mass-market meter designed for desktops in 1949. The first automatic mail sorters were launched by the company in 1957, and mail inserters were created in 1961 to increase productivity and decrease costs associated with volume mailing. In 1968, Pitney Bowes created the first bar code equipment for retail use.

The company launched Postage by Phone in 1978, reducing reliance on post office visits. In 1986, the company began offering fax machines and scales with microprocessors. Pitney Bowes introduced Paragon, which calculates and affixes postage based on size and weight, in 1992. Line of credit for postage was launched in 1996, followed by D3 software, which allowed message management via email, fax, hard copy, and web, in 1998. In the 2000s, Pitney Bowes introduced its DM1000 Mailing System and IntelliLink technology, a new collection of digital postage meters called the DM Infinity Series, four AddressRight printers, and the IntelliJet Printing System.

The company enhanced its Internet-based shipping service in 2011 with the introduction of its 'pbSmartPostage' mailing tool, which "[integrates] postage, package routing, shipping management and reporting into a Web app that can be accessed from any PC with a printer". In 2015, Pitney Bowes launched its AcceleJet inkjet system, which targeted transactional printers and was intended for companies printing at high volumes. In addition to stuffing envelopes, weighing documents, and printing postage, the 2015 model of the Relay Multi-Channel Communication Suite scans and uploads files and offers email marketing functions.

In January 2016, Pitney Bowes began using technology by Electric Imp to enable Internet connectivity for postage meters. The software created a maintenance program, described and tracked problems with machines, and enhanced data sharing. In March, Pitney Bowes introduced Single Customer View, which used the company's Spectrum Technology Platform to facilitate data sharing. The customer relationship management aggregator was not specific to the medical industry, but marked a push into the healthcare field.

In mid 2016, the company introduced its first channel program and partnered with information technology providers, including global systems integrators Accenture and Capgemini, to help companies find and communicate with customers. The company released a digital device, called SmartLink, in July 2016; the product was developed in collaboration with Electric Imp and connected postage meters to Pitney Bowes' cloud-computing technology, and enabled other maintenance and monitoring services as well. Pitney Bowes also released a suite of digital services, including: Clarity Advisor, which collected machine data to "combat unplanned downtime"; Clarity Optimizer, which used analytics to increase productivity; and Clarity Scheduler which, according to Computer Weekly, "automates placement of the right job on the right machine at the right time". In September 2016, the company partnered with Lighthouse Computer Services to create data solutions designed to help businesses identify and keep customers, improve marketing initiatives, and reduce fraud. In 2017, the company released its location intelligence tool, called GeoVision, which uses data provided by PSMA Australia and allows companies to "visualise, analyse, and ultimately make use of that data to inform decisions".

The company launched its e-commerce business in 2012, to support businesses with online orders that are shipped to consumers. In April 2016, Pitney Bowes launched its "Commerce Cloud" platform, allowing customers to calculate payments, print labels, and process international transactions, among other tasks, using the company's applications. In August 2024, the company began exiting the business via a sale.
