= Neopost web-enabled stamps =

34c Pane of 4 Stamps

Neopost web-enabled stamps or Neopostage is a postage stamp that is part of the family of computerized postage. These stamps were developed by Neopost Online and Northrop Grumman Corporation. The joint effort resulted in an innovative self-service stamp vending system. Neopost Online is a US subsidiary of Neopost Inc. Testing of this system was authorized by the United States Postal Service (USPS) in March 2001.

The self-service stamp vending system allowed consumers to:

1. Touch a display screen to activate the kiosk.
2. Peruse through a variety of stamp denominations and quantities for purchase.
3. Select the desired purchase.
4. Swipe credit card information to submit the purchase order.

The kiosk then:

1. Logs on the centrally located database to get credit card authorization.
2. Awaits approval of purchase from a centrally located database.
3. Receives purchasing authorization information from the centrally located database..
4. Prints the purchasing and stamp information onto adhesive paper (from roll or individual sheets).
5. Dispenses the stamp sheets to the consumer.

The ability to peruse, request, authorize, print, and dispense a stamp purchase using the Internet made these the world's first browser-based stamps.

The Neopost web-enabled stamps are listed in Scott catalogue (Specialized Version) under Computer Vended Postage section with several unlisted varieties.
