= Arthur Pitney =

American businessman (1871–1933)

Arthur H. Pitney
- Born: November 10, 1871; Quincy, Illinois, United States
- Died: September 18, 1933 (aged 61); Stamford, Connecticut, United States
- Occupations: Businessman, inventor
- Known for: Inventor of the Postal Meter, Co-founder with Walter Bowes of the Pitney Bowes Postage Meter Company
- Awards: Franklin Institute Certificate of Merit

Arthur Hill Pitney (1871–1933) was an American inventor and businessman, best known as the father of the postage meter. Pitney filed a patent application, in Stamford, Connecticut for the world’s first postage meter on December 9, 1901. He presented, demonstrated and perfected his invention over two decades – after partnering with Walter Bowes, the postage meter was approved by the U.S. Postal Service. He co-founded the Pitney-Bowes Postage Meter Company in 1920, now known as Pitney Bowes. Pitney’s invention, the Pitney Bowes Model M Postage Meter, has been recognized as an International Historic Mechanical Engineering Landmark by the American Society of Mechanical Engineers.

== Biography ==
Arthur Pitney was born in Quincy, Illinois in 1871. In 1890 he moved to Chicago, where he attended the World's Columbian Exposition in 1893, spending days viewing the mechanical inventions on display. Later, while working as a clerk in a wallpaper store he identified a problem that was costing his firm time and money — affixing postage stamps to hundreds of envelopes took time and also led to stamp theft. An inventor in the classic “tinkerer-putterer” mode, he created a device to simplify business mailings. The first postage meter device consisted of a manual crank, chain action, printing die, counter and lockout device.

In 1902, he received a patent for "a hand-cranked gadget with two locking counters — one counting down the amount of postage remaining from the original amount purchased, the other counting up to show the total postage dispensed". He gave the device a trial run in 1903.

He formed the Pitney Postal Machine Company in 1902, which became the American Postage Meter Company in 1912. The machine’s acceptance by the public was slow. Pitney — his finances and marriage both wrecked by the project — resorted to selling insurance but persisted.

In 1919, Pitney was introduced to Walter Bowes, an industrialist who had success marketing a post office stamp canceling machine. In April 1920, the Pitney-Bowes Postage Meter Company was formed. In September of that year, the Model M Postage Meter was approved by the U.S. Postal Service, legislation was passed by Congress and the first postage meter was put into commercial use on November 16, 1920.

Pitney and Bowes set up a manufacturing presence in Stamford, Connecticut and by 1922 there were branch offices in a dozen major cities and the Pitney-Bowes postage meter was also approved for use in Canada and England. He was awarded the Franklin Institute's Certificate of Merit in 1922.

Pitney and Bowes were often at odds, and after they had a dispute in 1924, Pitney resigned. While his innovations led to the creation of an entire mail processing industry, his efforts brought him little joy. Pitney suffered a stroke in 1927 and died in 1933.
