= Deister Electronics =

German electronics company

Deister Electronic is the name generally used to refer to Deister Electronic GmbH Barsinghausen, Germany, and its subsidiaries in North America. Deister Electronic is an industrial enterprise specialised on electronic non-contact identification and security systems founded in 1977. In North America, the companies are Deister Electronics USA, Inc. of Manassas, VA, and Deister Electronics, Inc. of Ontario, Canada.

Deister Electronic develops, manufactures and distributes mechatronic equipment and systems for access control, protection, security and identification including the corresponding IT solutions and provides the installation and customer services. The enterprise takes a very active part in the development for instance in the research of Ultra high frequency technologies as partner of the University of Applied Sciences Fachhochschule Hannover. A recent development is the metallic and textile UHF transponder.

== Market ==
For years, the application of such technologies is consistently growing and so is the market for its products and services. This development began in the early 1990. Already in this stage, Deister Electronic was among the 20 relevant players on the international level. Today, the branch is distinguished by an extraordinary growth of most diversified solutions and services, by an environment of brisk innovative activities and a focus on export. A typical example is the implementation of the Deister Electronic key management and control access system in the Centre for Technology and Development of Renault. 700 enterprises in 43 countries are members of Association of Automatic Identification and Mobility AIM Global, amongst them several institutes of the Fraunhofer Society, Canon Production Printing, Siemens and Deister Electronic.

== Technology ==
The variety of RFID application components comprises interrogators (also readers), tags (also labels), integrated circuits (also chips), antennas, transponders, converters, processors and the corresponding software system solutions. Their purpose is to detect and identify persons, vehicles, goods, keys and valuables automatically and without physical contact, in same cases biometrically, to capture information about them, to control their access and guide their further way. Deister Electronic systems are based upon the technology of electromagnetic waves, Radio Frequency Identification (RFID), biometrics and Bluetooth technology. They operate within the range from long waves to ultra high frequency, that is up to three Gigahertz (GHz). Recent innovations are mini readers in computer mice, metallic and textile ultra high frequence transponder.

== Background ==
Some aspects of the security and control technologies are unleash skepticism, critic and discussion, so for instance, unknown risks for organisms by electromagnetic radiation or possible perturbation of the functioning of medical equipment by RFID labels. Moreover, there are politically motivated reservations, anxieties and mistrust against a prevailing and illegitimated observation and control.

== Enterprise ==
The head office and development centre of Deister Electronic is situated in the small town of Barsinghausen southwest of Hanover in Germany. Deister Electronic dates back from an outsourcing project of three graduates of the University of Hannover in 1977. The US and Canadian companies were established in the 1980s and have been run independently and successfully for over 20 years. In our days, this technological enterprise with a total staff of 240 employees, branches overseas – especially in the USA and Canada – as well as in Europe – especially France and United Kingdom – belongs to the typical German export orientated business.

== See also ==
- Access control
- Auto-id
- Biometry
- Mechatronics
- RFID
- Radio-frequency identification
- Security
- Security system
