= Affixing machine =

Machine that affixes postage stamps

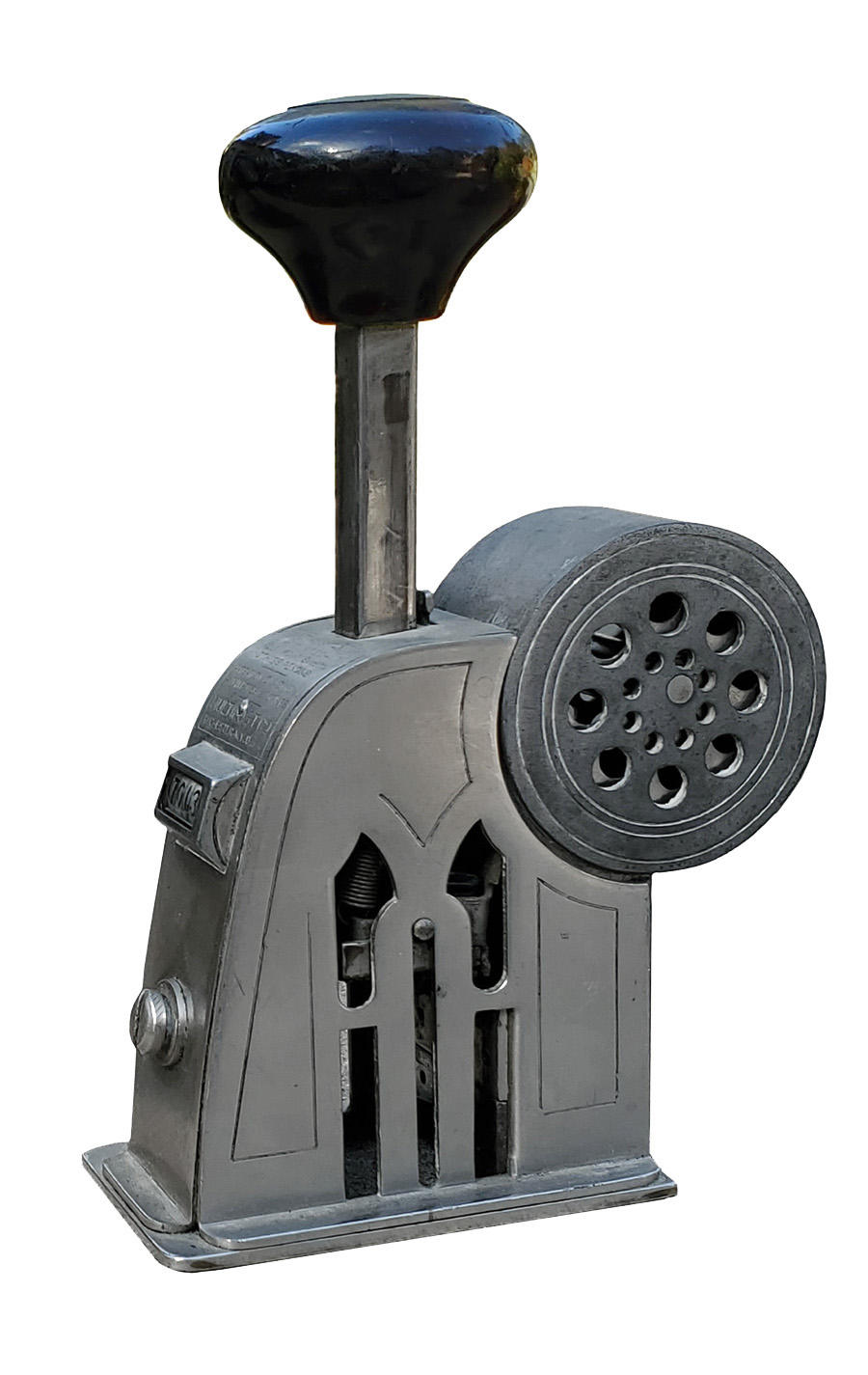
Multipost Stamp Affixer circa 1912

An affixing machine is a machine that affixes postage stamps to an envelope, postcard or wrapper. Affixing machines first appeared in the 1850s but were not widely used until the early 20th century. Stamp affixing machines were brought about by the need to mechanically affix stamps for bulk processing of mail. A secondary reason for the machines was to make the theft of stamps more difficult for employees with access to a large inventory of coils. The first widespread machine was created in 1884 by Engle Frankmussler, a Norwegian, who created the ‘Postage Stamp Affixing Machine’ as it was then called, was a crank-operated machine that was effective but vulnerable to tampering.

== See also ==
- Postage meter
