= Maponics =

American geographic boundary data company

- Type: Subsidiary
- Industry: Location-based Data
- Founded: 2001; 25 years ago
- Founder: Darrin Clement
- Headquarters: White River Junction, Vermont, US
- Parent: Pitney Bowes
- Website: www.maponics.com

Maponics is a geographic boundary data company headquartered in White River Junction, Vermont, and a subsidiary of Pitney Bowes. The company produces geographic information system (GIS) boundary data used in mapping applications and location-based services, covering neighbourhood boundaries, school attendance zones, shopping districts, ZIP codes and other geographic delineations.

== History ==
Maponics was founded in 2001 by Darrin Clement. Maponics specialises in creating pre-defined geofences and localised geographic boundaries for use in mapping, real estate and location-aware applications. Maponics' location data is used by many of the world's largest organizations, including Foursquare, Realtor.com, Trulia, ZipRealty, and Fannie Mae.

In mid-2016, Pitney Bowes acquired Maponics for an undisclosed amount.
