= Walter Bowes =

American businessman (1882–1957)

- Born: August 13, 1882; Bradford, England, United Kingdom
- Died: June 24, 1957 (aged 74); Washington, D.C., United States
- Occupations: Industrialist, sportsman
- Known for: co-founder of Pitney-Bowes Postage Meter Company (now named Pitney-Bowes Inc.)

Walter Bowes (1882–1957) was an English-born industrialist and sportsman, who came to fame in the United States as the co-founder of technology firm Pitney-Bowes Postage Meter Company (now Pitney-Bowes)

An entrepreneur and salesman, he achieved great success as a businessman and also had a passion for racing yachts and horses.

He co-founded the Pitney-Bowes Postage Meter Company in 1920 with inventor Arthur Pitney. Today, the company that bears his name, Pitney Bowes Inc., is a multi-billion dollar provider of software, hardware and services related to documents, packaging, mailing and shipping, collectively referred to as the mailstream.

== Biography ==
Bowes was born in Maw Street, Bradford, England, in 1882 and later moved to the United States.

He began his career as a salesman. In one of his earliest jobs at the Addressograph Company, an Iowa-based manufacturer of addressing systems, he achieved some success—but quit the company after a year so he could sail his 23-foot sloop.

In 1908, he was selling check-endorsing machines, and a year later he bought the Universal Stamping Machine Company. Within a few years, his company had established relationships with the U.S. Postal Service, providing stamp-cancelling machines on a rental basis. Between 1912 and 1917 he achieved prominence in postal circles for his promotion of permit printing of mail. He expanded internationally, selling his machines to Germany, England and Canada. In 1917, he moved his operation to Stamford, Connecticut.

While he was successful selling stamp-cancelling machines, Bowes felt that postage stamps would become obsolete—and that a more automated way to apply postage could present opportunities. A postal official suggested he contact Arthur Pitney, an inventor who had been working on such a device for nearly two decades. When they met in 1919, Pitney had already invested $90,000 in his invention, his patents were expiring and his company, the American Postage Meter Company, had little to show for his efforts.

By 1919, the two men combined their firms and the Pitney-Bowes Postage Meter Company was born. While Pitney was the inventor, Bowes concentrated his activities in Washington, lobbying for the passage of the necessary legislation that would open the door for the postage meter. The United States Congress passed the enabling legislation in 1920, and the first piece of metered mail—a letter from Bowes to his wife—was posted on December 10, 1920. By 1922, 400 meters were in service, accounting for more than $4 million in postage.

While the company was growing, neither Pitney nor Bowes enjoyed this success. The two men were constantly at odds and in 1924, Arthur Pitney resigned from the company after a dispute with Bowes. After the co-founder’s departure, uncertainty reigned at Pitney Bowes and Bowes’ stepson, Walter Wheeler II, was promoted to general manager.

A 1939 article in Time notes that “Walter Bowes is nervous, restless; he hates a desk and office hours, prefers to putter about his home.” An accomplished sportsman, he devoted much of his time to racing yachts and horses. In 1929, Bowes sailed his six-meter Saleema to an international championship.

Walter Bowes shifted from president to Chairman of Pitney Bowes in 1938. Two years later, he retired with a 10-year consulting contract. He was wealthy before his death in 1957 at the age of 75.
