= Canon Production Printing =

Netherlands-based subset of Canon

- Formerly: Océ N.V. (1927–2019)
- Type: Subsidiary
- Industry: Manufacturing, technology
- Founded: 1877; 149 years ago
- Founder: Lodewijk van der Grinten
- Headquarters: Venlo, Netherlands
- Key people: Takanobu Nakamasu (chairman and CEO); Charlie Probst (COO)
- Products: Printers, scanners, plotters, copiers, printing software, consulting services
- Revenue: €1240 million (2018)
- Number of employees: 3,010 (FTE, 2019)
- Parent: Canon Inc. (2010–present)
- Website: cpp.canon

Canon Production Printing, known as Océ until the end of 2019, is a Netherlands-based subset of Canon that develops, manufactures and sells printing and copying hardware and related software. The product line includes office printing and copying machinery, production printers, and wide-format printers for both technical documentation and color display graphics.

The history of Océ as a company can be traced back to 1877, although its printing-related activities did not begin until 1919.

The company has research, development, and production facilities in the Netherlands, Germany, Japan, Czechia, Romania and the United States.

The acquisition of Océ by Canon Inc. of Japan took place in 2010.

== History ==
=== Founding ===
Océ logo

Océ began in 1877 as a family business manufacturing machines for coloring butter and margarine. The company's founder, chemist Lodewijk van der Grinten, supplied this coloring to farmers and then this was supplied to the margarine factories of Jurgens and Van den Bergh. In 1930, the margarine factories of Jurgens and Van den Bergh and the English Lever Brothers merged to become Unilever. From 1877 to 1972, Unilever used only the coloring produced by the Venlo factory in its margarine.

In 1919 the grandson of Lodewijk, Louis van der Grinten, became interested in the blueprint process used for producing wide-format technical drawings. At that time, blueprint paper was extremely light-sensitive, and had a very short shelf life. Louis invented a coating that made blueprint paper last up to a year. This is considered the company's first step into providing document solutions.

=== Company milestones, including acquisitions, collaborations, and partnerships ===
- 1919: Louis van der Grinten conducted research into blueprint materials and entered the copier market. The breakthrough was the development of a paper superior to the former light-sensitive coated blueprint paper that had short shelf lives.
- 1927: Louis van der Grinten invents an ammonia-free, diazo-copying process for technical drawings. In contrast to the earlier paper, the new paper had no so-called azo components. To emphasize this user-friendly aspect compared with the competitors, Van der Grinten called the paper O.C. (Ohne Componente).
- 1927: Because the local stock exchange required three letter abbreviations, the company was renamed in 1927 as Océ, based on the initials O.C. for "Ohne Componente" (without components). This product name became the brand name and was registered as a trademark in 1930.
- 1930s: Introduction of the "Combine", a machine that combines two functions of the copying process – developing and drying. Before the development of the Combine, two separated machines were needed for copying: an exposure machine and a developer.
- 1956: Jan van Susante was the first person from outside the Van der Grinten family who joined the Océ board in 1956. He took Océ onto the Stock Exchange and ensured further expansion with acquisitions throughout Europe.
- 1957: Andeno was set up. This company was a 100 percent Océ subsidiary and developed diazo chemicals for Océ, but also chemicals for the pharmaceutical and cosmetics industries. In later times, Océ's interest in Diazo disappeared and Océ sold the company to the Dutch chemical concern DSM in 1986.
- 1958: The first foreign operating company was opened in Germany, Müllheim. In 1964, the enterprise took over the activities of its Belgian licensee Jobé. This was followed by acquisitions in Sweden, Austria, Denmark, Norway, Italy and France. As a result, Océ set up operating companies in all these countries.
- 1966: Océ 4800 automat was launched. This high-speed machine gave Océ access to a new segment of the office market. The equipment produced 4,800 A4 copies per hour (80 copies per minute) and was popular with shipping agents and forwarders who had to copy numerous import and export documents in a short time.
- 1966: The acquisition of company ‘Photasia’ increased the size of the group by roughly 60 percent. In relative terms, this was one of the two largest acquisitions in Océ's history.
- 1967: The company entered the office-printing market with an electro-photographic process for copying documents using special, chemically-treated paper. It also started up a factory to build its own equipment.
- 1969: Océ switched from electrofax technology to electro photographic technology for the office market.
- 1970: The company changed its name to ‘Océ-van der Grinten N.V.'.
- 1973: Launch of the Océ 1700, the first plain paper copier. Instead of a drum, the Océ 1700 used a zigzag folded, endless master belt. The so-called 'copy press' technology in this machine differed from the true xerographic reproduction in that it did not use a developer, utilized fewer electro-static charges in the printing engine (hence supposedly minimizing ozone emissions), and maintained a lower fusing temperature. Soon after, the company also developed an application for wide-format printing.
- 1978: Acquisition of UK-based Ozalid Group Holdings Ltd., developer of the Ozalid process of reproduction, and Océ's biggest rival in the diazo printing market. With this acquisition of a company almost the size of Océ, Océ became the largest manufacturer of printing products for the engineering market.
- 1984: Launch of first large format copier.
- In 1989, it bought the plotter business of French company Schlumberger. With this acquisition, important developments in colour printing, both for wide and narrow format, occurred for Océ.
- 1990: Start of recovery activities for parts of machines within an assembly department in Venlo. Components were removed and installed in other machines, after the parts had been thoroughly cleaned and inspected.
- 1991: Acquisition of AM International's Bruning Division of Chicago, Illinois, United States. Bruning was a wide-format (engineering graphics) competitor based in the United States where Océ had been making footholds with its own similar equipment. Bruning employees were retained and eventually trained on Océ equipment. For a short transition period, both the Océ and Bruning names appeared on machine nameplates, eventually being changed to Océ-USA.
- 1994: Introduction of Océ Image Logic, a system that scans and converts hard copy information into a digital format.
- In 1995, the company entered the very high speed, high volume printing market when it acquired Siemens’ High Performance Printing Division of German computer company Siemens-Nixdorf. This division, located in Poing, near Munich, made printers capable of producing over 1000 continuous-feed prints a minute, and focused on printing bills and statements. Also at this time, Océ started to bring digital printers/copiers to market.
- 1997: Company name changed into 'Océ N.V.'
- In 1998 Océ acquired Cleveland, Ohio based Groupware Technology, a software company specializing in Electronic Document Management software to form Oce Groupware Technology.
- In 2000 Océ acquired Espace Graphique, a French distributor of large-format display graphics equipment.
- In 2001, it acquired the Professional Imaging Division of Swiss-based Gretag Imaging Group, Inc., a maker of large-format display printing equipment.
- 2003: The first Océ Arizona UV flatbed printer.
- 2005: Acquisition of U.S.-based Imagistics International, Inc., originally Pitney Bowes Office Systems (PBOS), which sold fax machines, copiers, and multifunction devices. In late 2006, Imagistics became the Océ Digital Document Solutions (DDS) division, and later, the Document Printing Systems division. This division was based in Trumbull, Connecticut.
- 2006: The first cut sheet printer to feature Océ Gemini Instant Duplex technology was introduced. With the help of this technology, it was possible to print simultaneously both sides of a sheet while maintaining accurate registration and offset-like quality.
- In 2006, it bought US-based CaseData, a leading provider of electronic discovery and litigation support services to US law firms and corporations.
- In 2007, Océ formed a partnership with Fujifilm, in order to sell an OEM version of the Océ Arizona 250 GT flatbed printer in Japan.
- In 2007, the partnership between Océ and Prism Software Corporation expanded.
- In 2007, Océ and Videk were reported to announce a new collaboration to “bring state-of-the-art verification systems” to transaction document printing.
- 2007: Celebration of 130 years of being in business with a symposium in Venlo, the Netherlands, where the company's main headquarters is situated. The company's business partners congratulated the company with an advertisement in the American business paper, The Wall Street Journal.
- In 2008, Océ and Konica Minolta entered a "basic partnership" agreement, covering technology exchange and a shared sales program.
- 2008: Introduction of the Océ CrystalPoint technology, which uses a gelling process before jetting the toner onto paper for improved sharpness of toner-dot edges.
- 2009: Canon and Océ announced on 16 November 2009 that they had reached a conditional agreement wherein Canon would buy all the shares of Océ in a fully Canon-funded, public cash offer. On 4 March 2010, Canon completed its purchase of Océ.

== Products and organization ==
Océ has three Strategic Business Units: Digital Document Systems (small format), Wide Format Printing Systems (wide format) and Océ Business Services.

=== Small format (up to A3 size) ===
- Cut sheet equipment, as used in daily office practice. Examples of Océ cut sheet printers are the Océ VarioPrint 6000 series and the Océ CS 1x3 series.
- Printing devices to print large quantities of transaction statements (e.g. invoices, bank statements), marketing material, books and newspapers. Within this segment there are two different types: (1)High-volume cut sheet equipment that prints on separate sheets like the Océ VarioPrint 6000 series and the Océ CS665; (2) Continuous feed equipment that prints on rolls of paper like the Océ ColorStream series and the Océ JetStream series.

=== Wide format (larger than A3 size) ===
- Equipment printing mainly on paper can be used to print technical documents. The target group of these printers (Océ PlotWave 300 and the Océ ColorWave 600) are for instance architects, engineering offices, construction companies, telecom and utilities businesses.
- Equipment printing on many different media such as paper, vinyl, textile, glass and tiles, including full-colour advertising posters. Examples of printers in this segment are the Océ Arizona series; Océ CS 9xxx series and Océ ColorWave 600.

=== Business services ===
This includes basic document services such as mail and print-room management, scanning, archiving and desktop-publishing services. Other services includes printer fleet management, on-demand printing, document-design services, and management of legal documents for litigation. The firm also offers outsourcing of insurance-policy process management.
