= Waste container =

Container to temporarily store waste

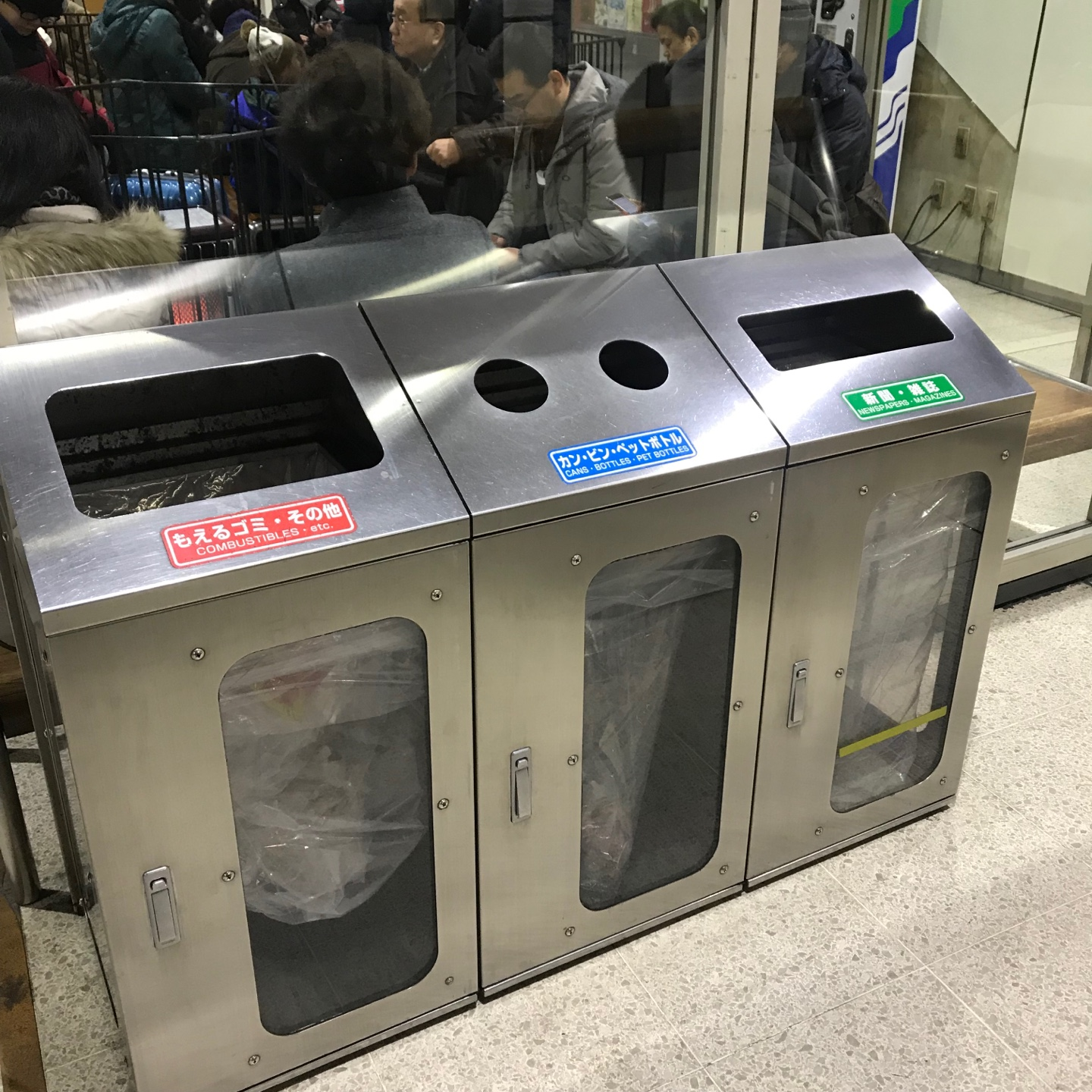
Waste containers divided into combustibles, bottles and cans, and newspapers and magazines in Japan

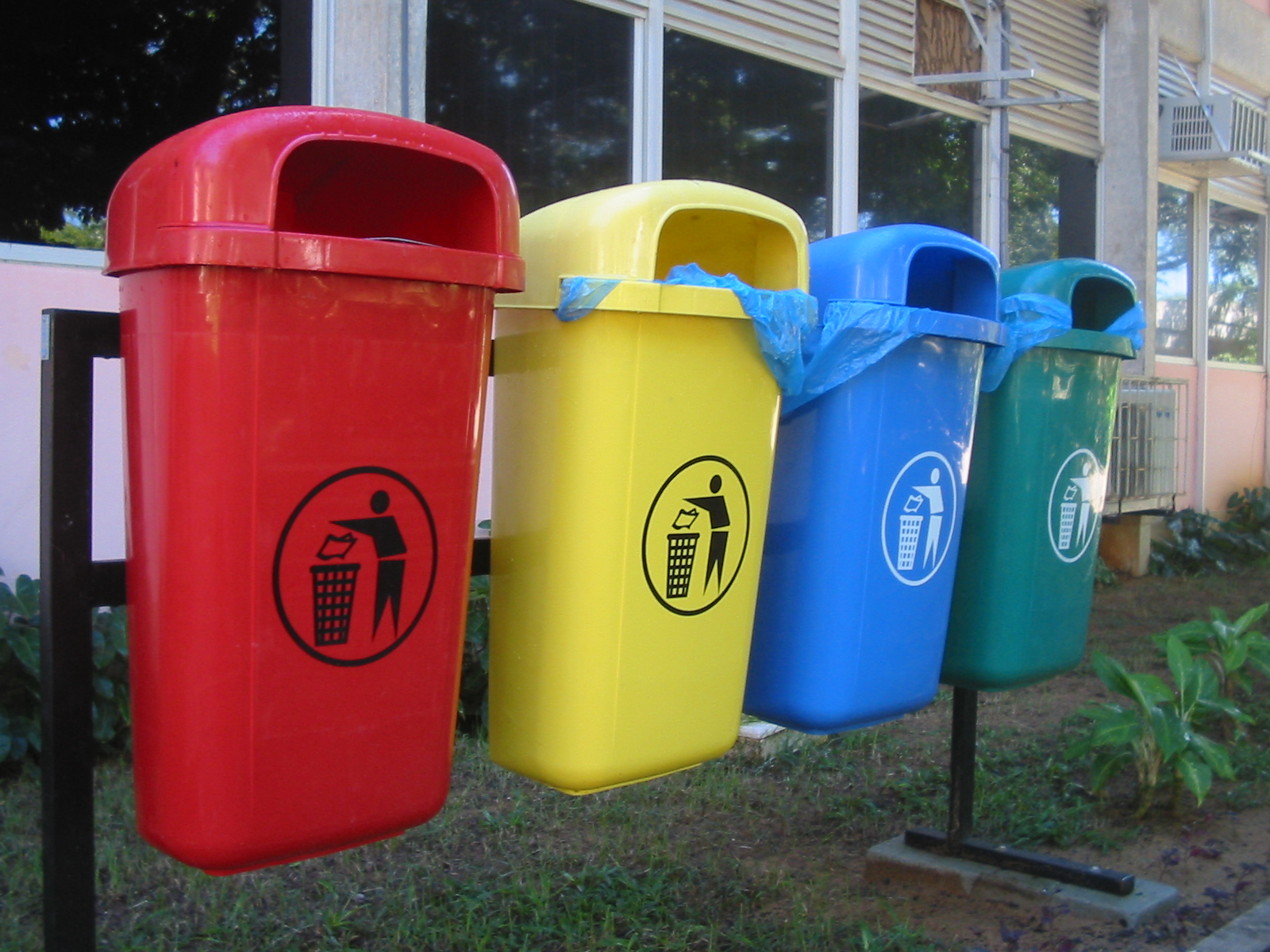
Recycling trash can in Natal, Brazil

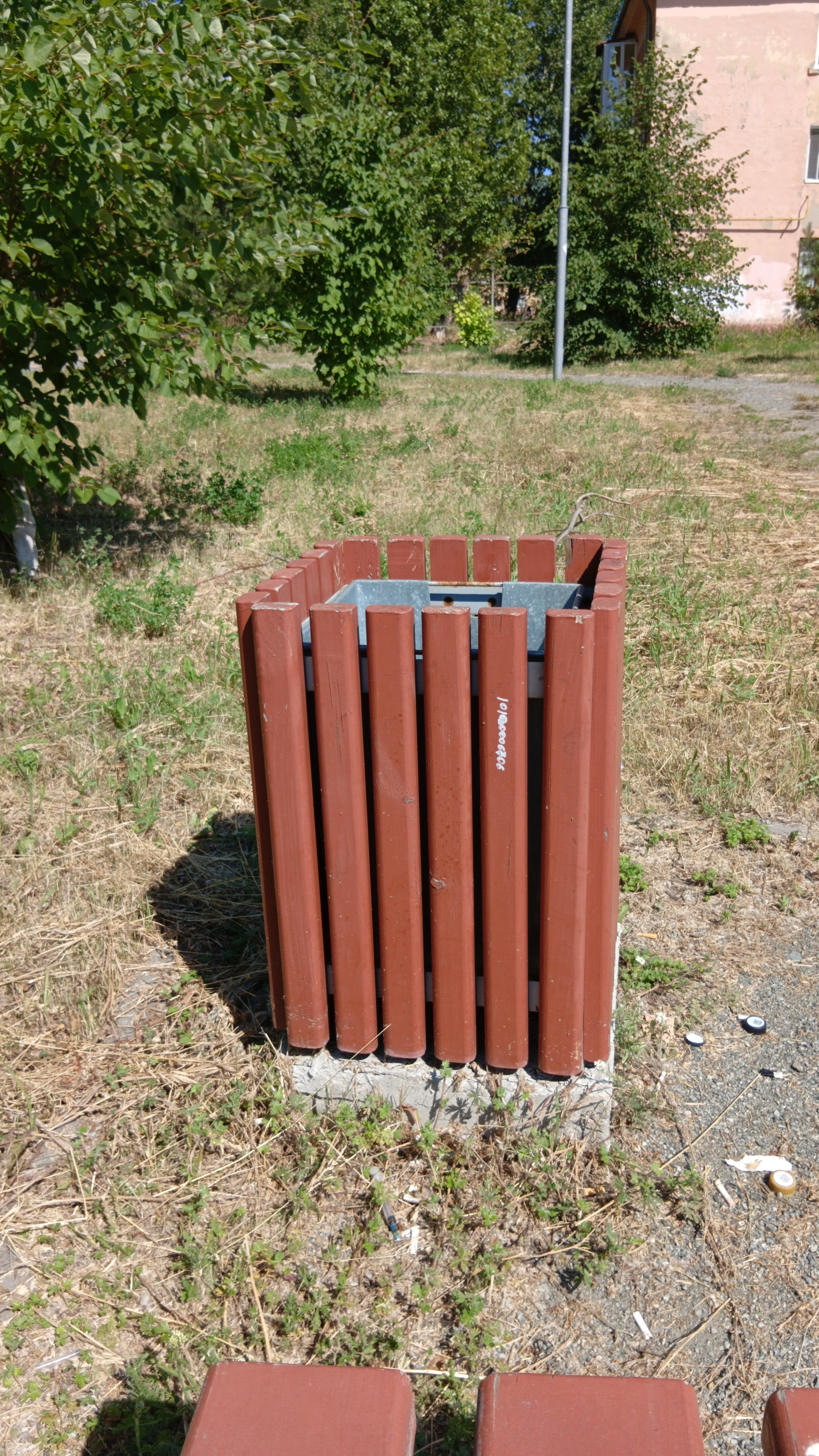
A dustbin in the park in Omsk, Russia

A waste container, known as a trash can, garbage can, or wastebasket (most commonly in the Americas); or known as a rubbish bin or dustbin (usually in Commonwealth English); among other names, is a type of container intended to store waste. It is usually made out of metal or plastic. The word bin (and rubbish for its contents) are more common in British English usage; trash and can are more common in American English usage. Garbage may refer to food waste specifically (when distinguished from trash) or to municipal solid waste in general. The word dumpster (from a genericised trademark) refers to a large outdoor waste container for garbage collectors to pick up the contents.

== Designs ==
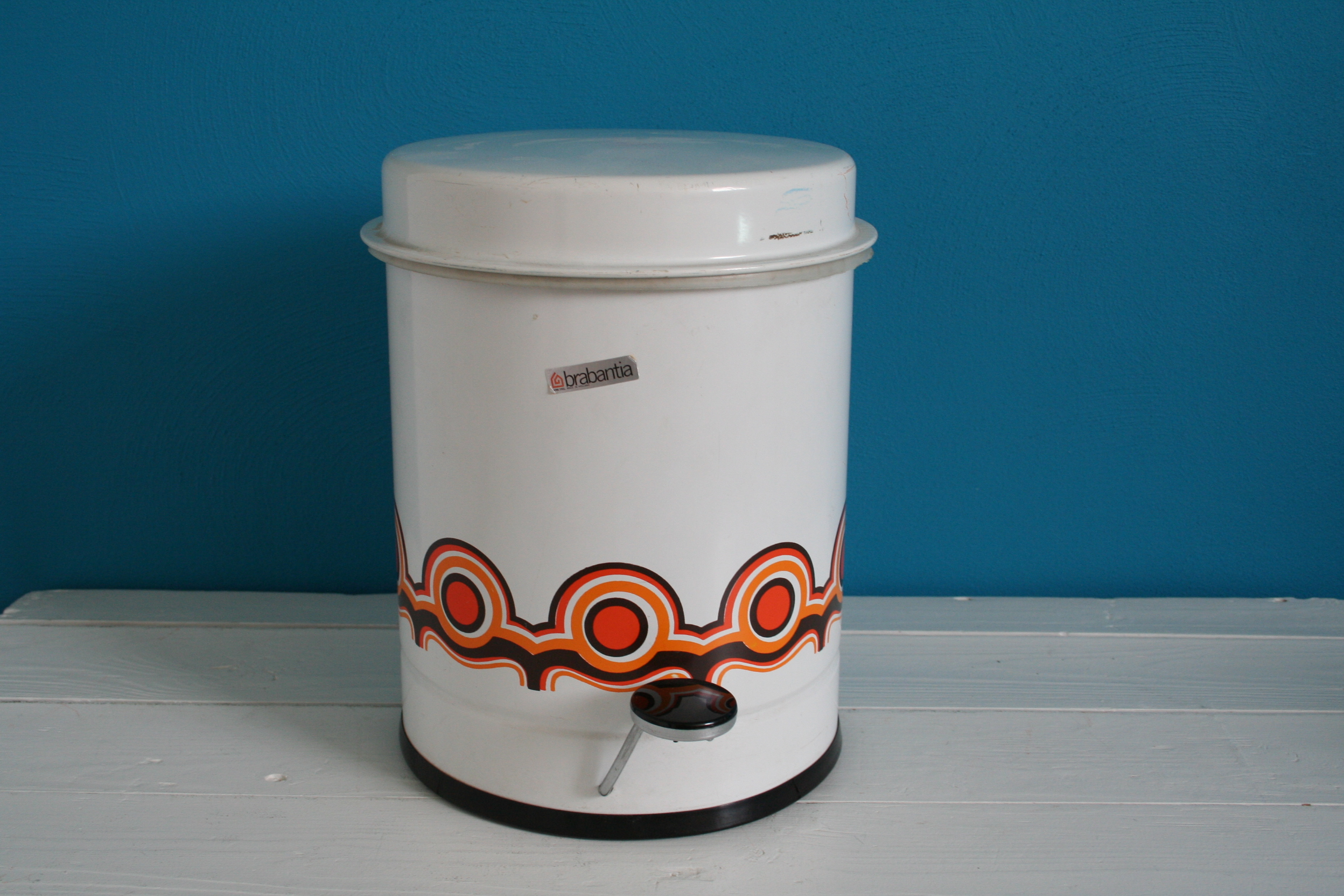
A pedal bin of 1972

Automated waste container in South Korea

Trash cans are typically made of steel or plastic (most commonly polyethylene), although some are made of wood or wicker.

A pedal bin is a container with a lid operated by a pedal. Lillian Moller Gilbreth, an industrial engineer and efficiency expert, invented the pedal bin in the 1920s for the disposal of kitchen waste. The pedal enables the user to open the lid without touching it with their hands.

In the 2010s, some bins have begun to include automated mechanisms such as a lid with infrared detection on the top of the can powered by batteries to open it rather than a pedal, freeing the user from touching the bin in any way. This helps prevent the bin lids becoming clogged with trash. These wastes containers are mostly made of stainless steel. Some bin models also include a small receptable for an air freshener.

== Origins ==
=== French ===
Legislation surrounding waste receptacles was first introduced in France in an 1883 prefectural order signed by Eugène Poubelle, from whose name the French word for a waste receptacle comes. This order mandated the provision and collection of waste bins to each household in Paris. These bins were specified as having to be between 80 and 120 litres in volume and having a handle and a lid. Three waste bins were to be allocated to each household in order to sort refuse from reclaimable fibres such as paper and cloth and other reusable materials like ceramics, glasses and oyster shells.

=== English ===
Legislation setting out the responsibilities for the provision and collection of "receptacles for the temporary deposit and collection of dust ashes and rubbish" by local authorities in Britain was first set out in the Public Health Act 1875. However, this did not mandate the use of them, leaving the decision to offer the service to local government instead.

== Household waste collection ==
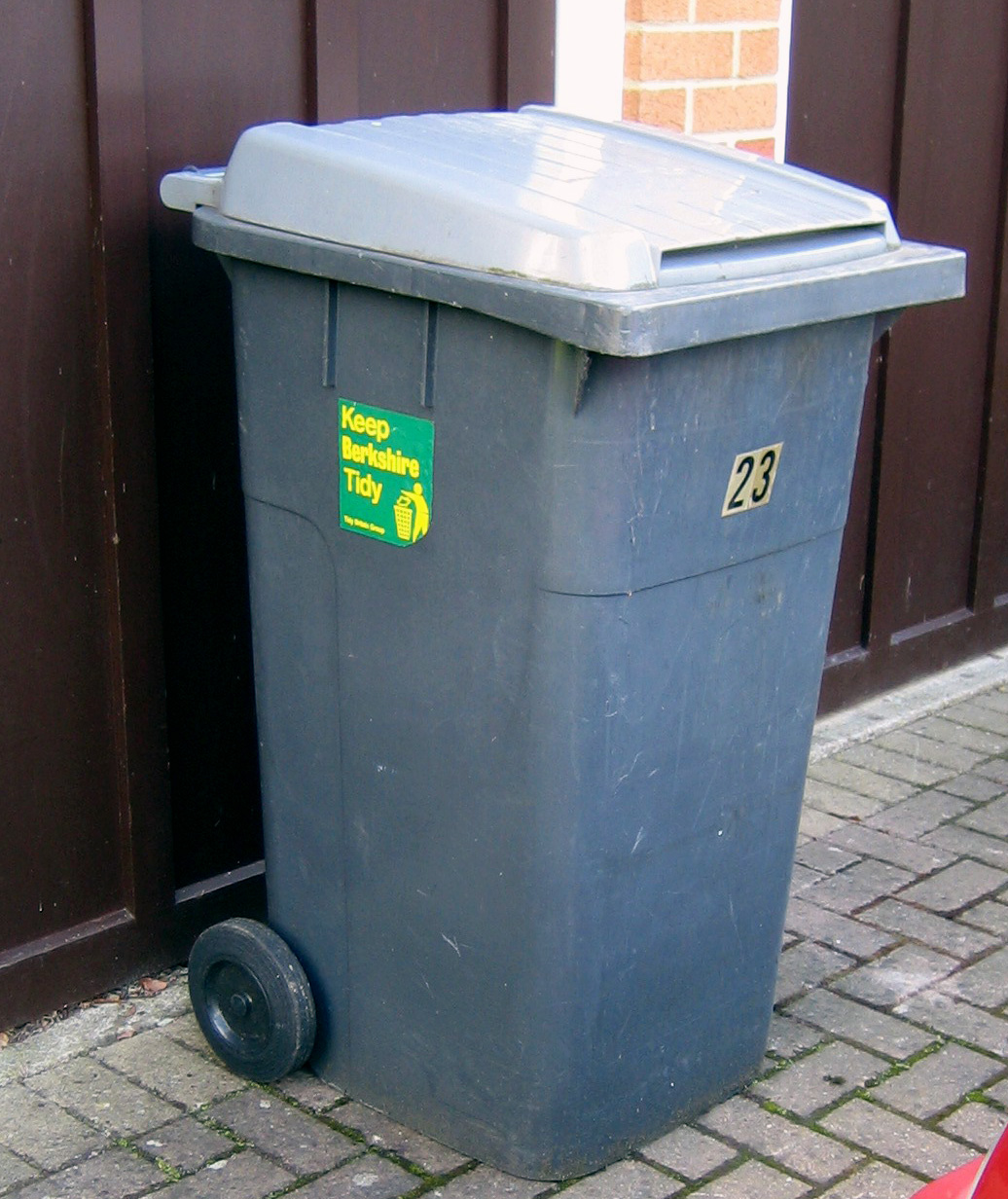
Household waste container (specifically, a wheelie bin) in Berkshire, England

In many cities and towns, there is a public waste collection service which regularly collects household waste from outside buildings. The waste is loaded into a garbage truck and driven to a landfill, incinerator or crush facility to be disposed of.

In some areas, each household has multiple bins for different categories of rubbish (usually represented by colours) depending on its suitability for recycling, which will instead be routed to a recycling center.

Roadside waste collection is often done by means of larger metal containers of varying designs, mostly called dumpsters in the US, and skips in the UK. However the functionalities of dumpsters and skips are somewhat different: while a skip is intended to be loaded onto a vehicle and transported, the contents of a dumpster are emptied into a garbage truck on site and the dumpster remains and its designated location.

Adding to this, there is another type of container known as a roll-off dumpster. This type is unique because it is designed for easy transportation and disposal of large amounts of waste. Roll-off dumpsters are set on a truck with a roll-off mechanism, allowing them to be rolled onto and off of the truck bed. This feature makes them particularly useful for large projects like construction, renovation, or extensive clean-ups where substantial amounts of waste are generated. They come in various sizes to accommodate different needs, and unlike regular dumpsters, they are open-topped for easier loading of large or irregularly shaped debris.

== Public collection ==
International symbol "Tidyman" used on packaging to remind people to dispose of it in a bin instead of littering

Public areas such as parks, often have litter bins placed to improve the social environment by encouraging people not to litter. Such bins in outdoor locations or other busy public areas are usually mounted to the ground or wall to discourage theft, and reduce vandalism, and to improve their appearance are sometimes deliberately artistic or cute. In dense urban areas, trash is stored underground below the receptacle. Many are lined with a plastic or paper bin bag to help contain liquids.

Some public waste containers are specially designed for the collection of dog feces. These are usually found in areas frequently visited by dog walkers, such as parks and playgrounds.

== Metaphors ==
The term "garbage can" is also used for a model of decision making, the "Garbage Can Model" of decision making. It is concerned with cases of decision making in great aggregate uncertainty which can cause decisions to arise that from a distant point of view might seem irrational.

A "trash can" metaphor is often used in computer operating system desktop environments as a place files can be moved for file deletion.

In a workplace setting, a bin may be euphemistically called "the circular file", "the round file" or "the janitor's file". Whereas useful documents are filed in a filing cabinet, which is rectangular, junk mail and other worthless items are "filed" in the bin, which is often round.

The term "wastebasket" is occasionally used in taxonomy to refer to less formal (and often paraphyletic) groupings that pose problems in classification (e.g., the proposed order Insectivora is considered a "wastebasket taxon", as it groups small mammals that do not fit nicely into other taxa), and the Nilo-Saharan language family is sometimes called "Greenberg's wastebasket", as it was a grouping made by him to fit the languages of Africa that did not fall into the other groups, Afroasiatic, Niger–Congo, and Khoisan.

== Examples ==
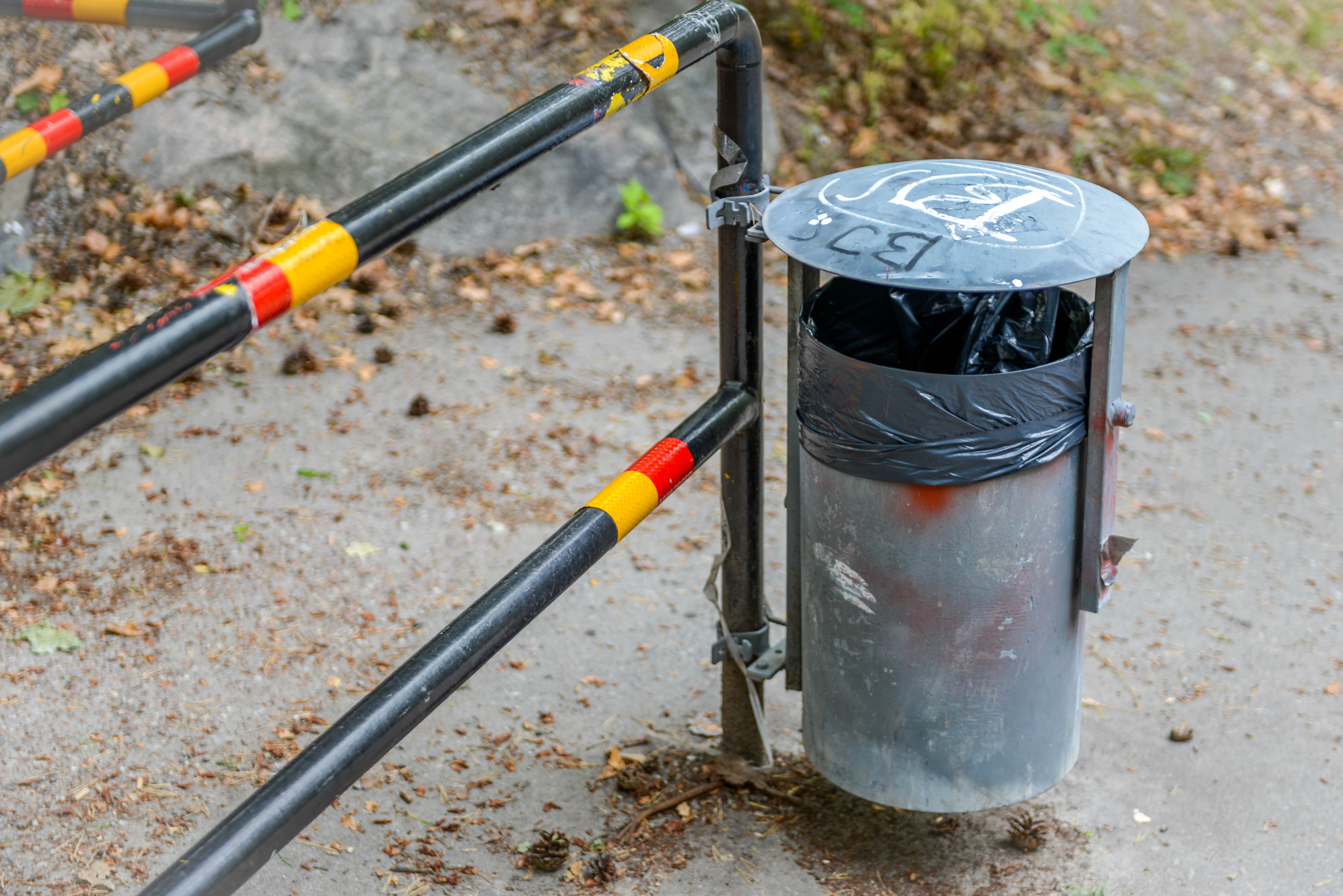
Public waste container in Nacka, Sweden

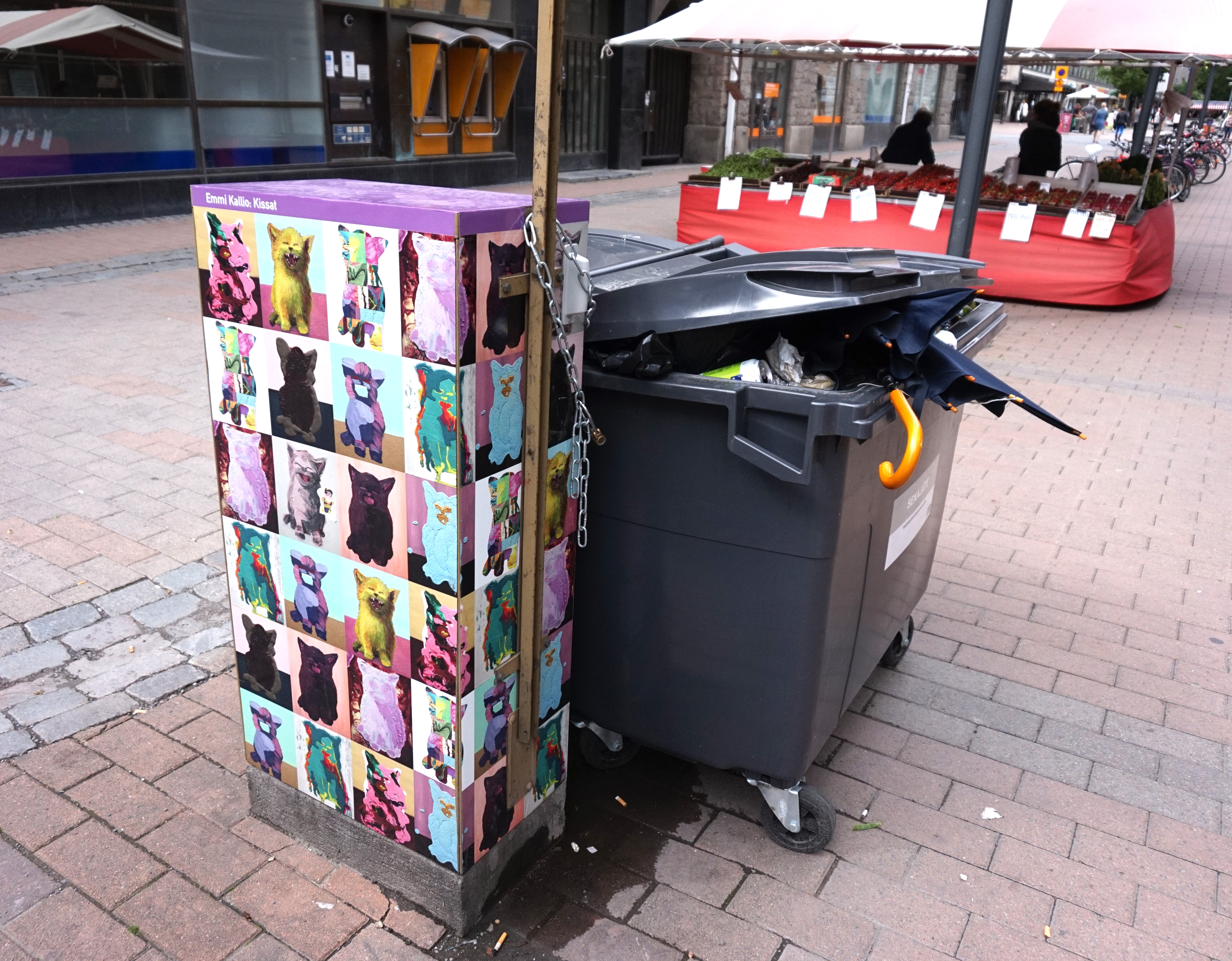
Waste container in Tampere, Finland

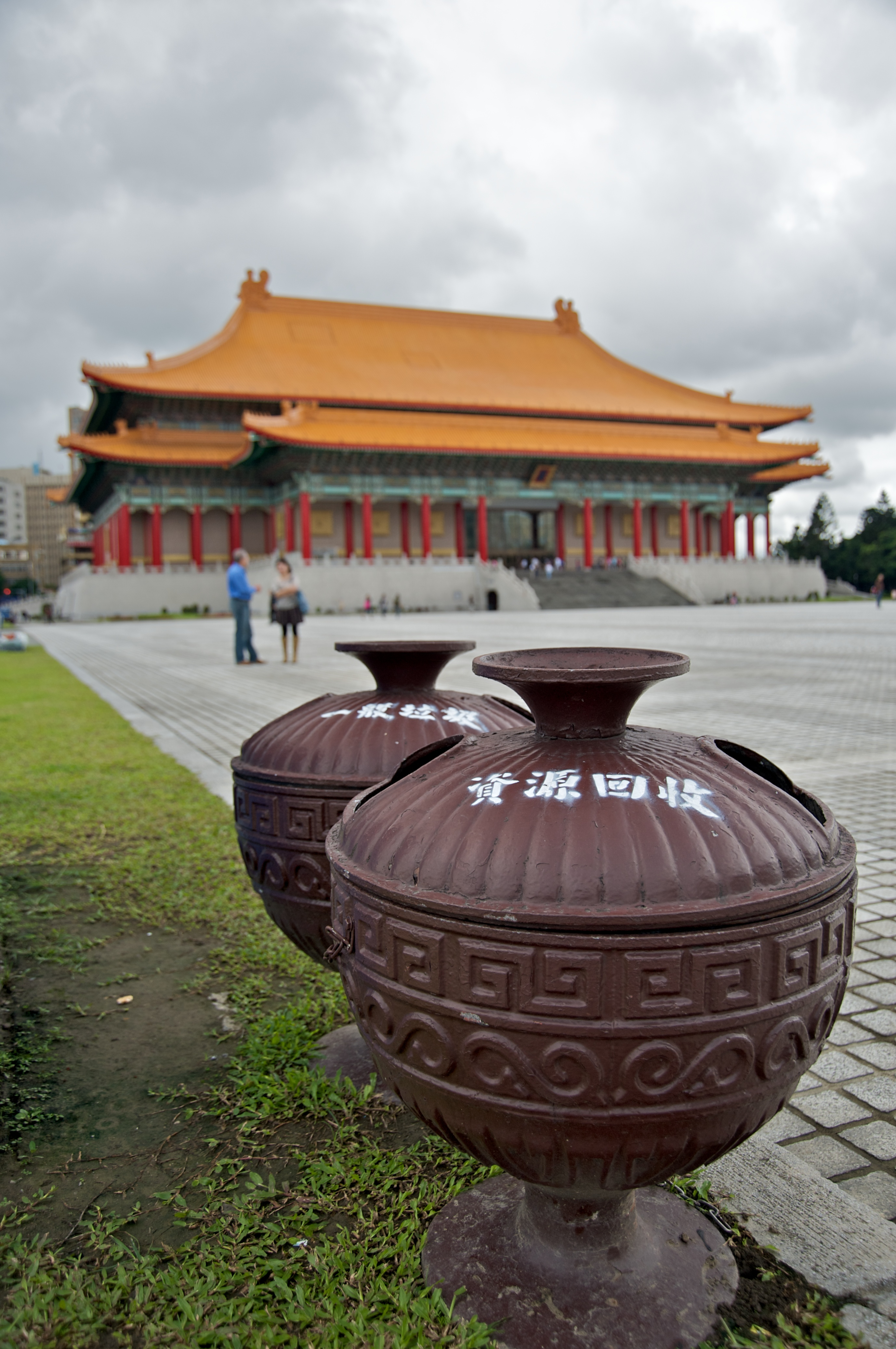
Waste containers at the National Theater in Taipei, Taiwan

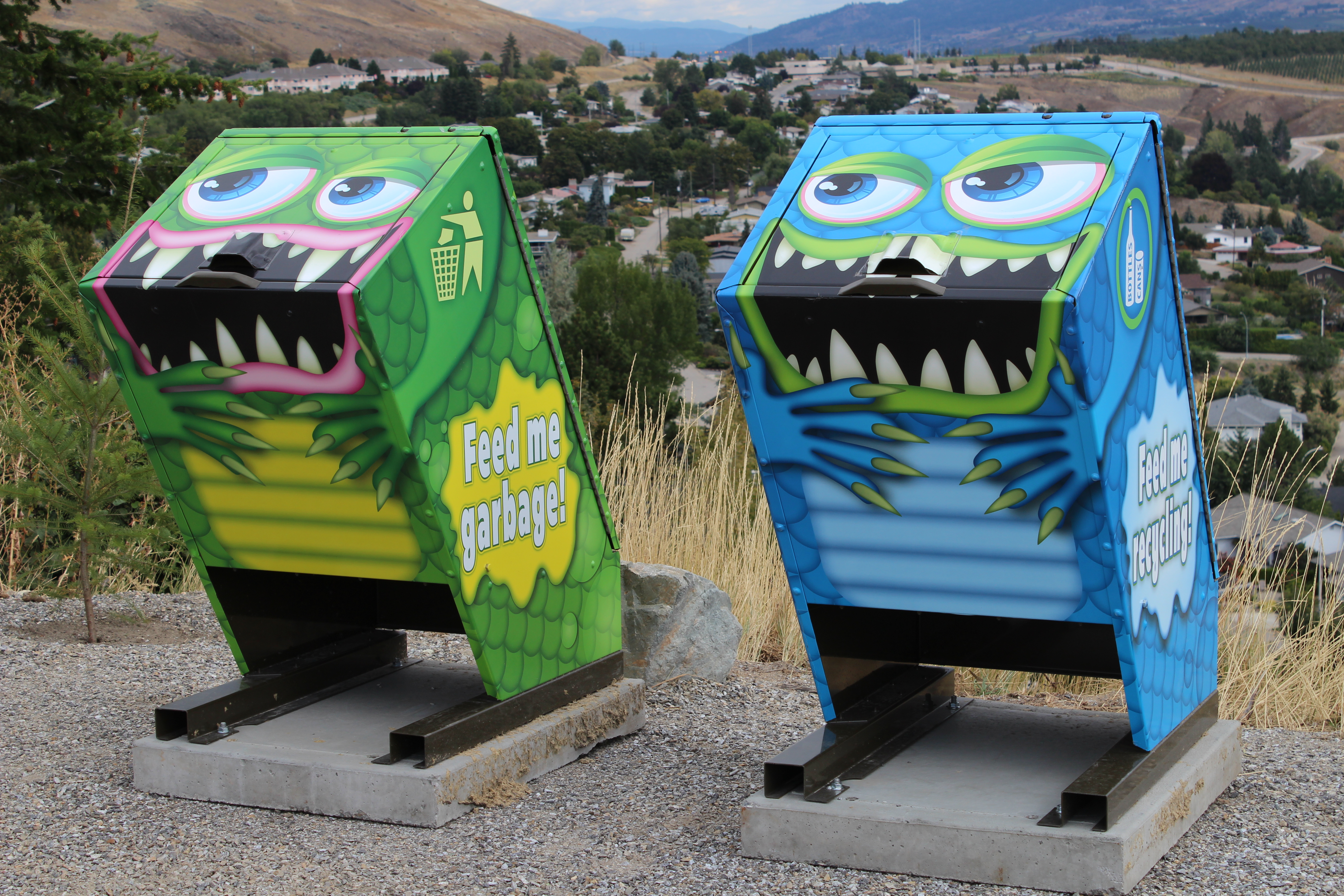
Art on waste containers

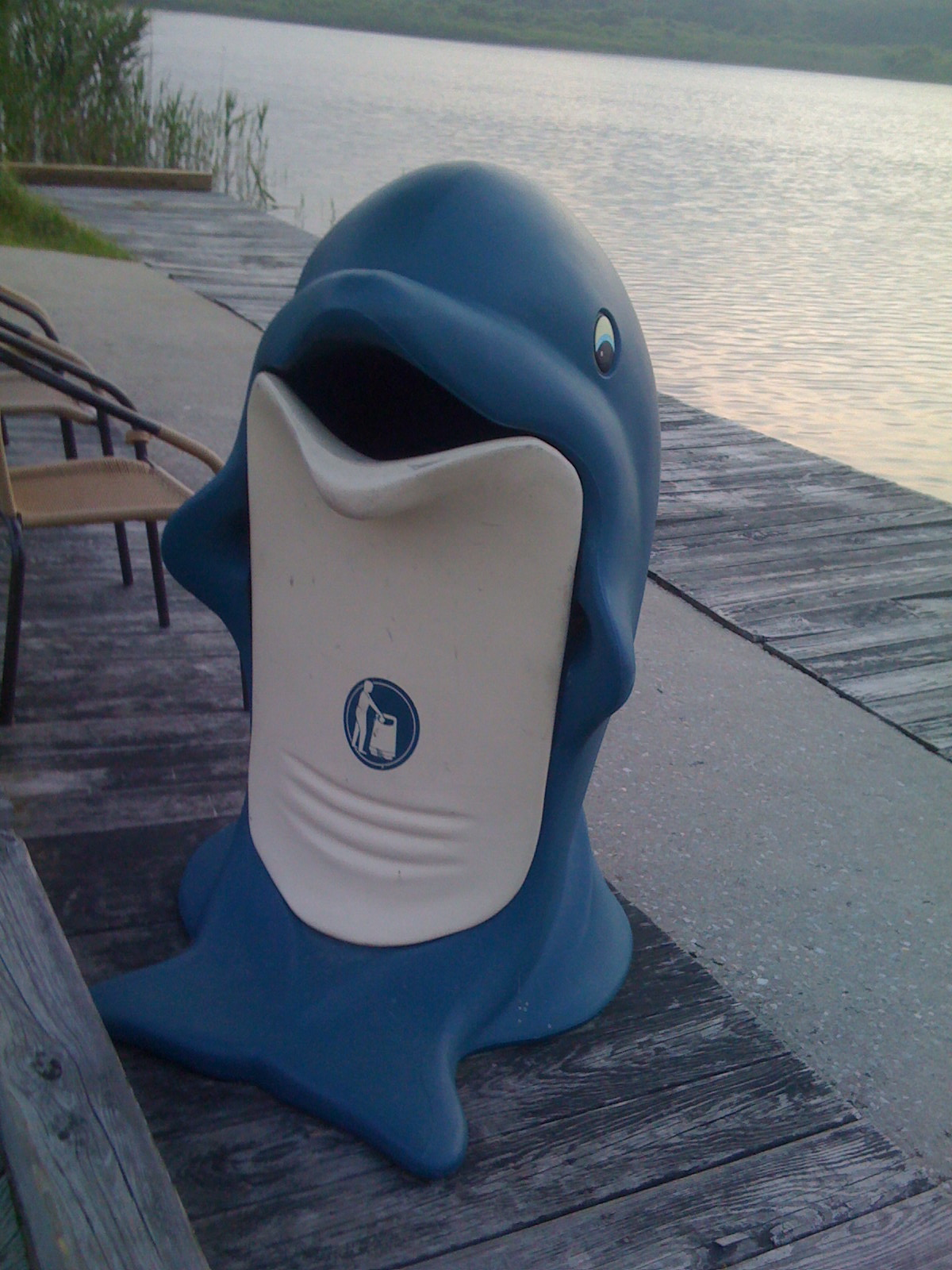
Animal trash can where the opening is the mouth

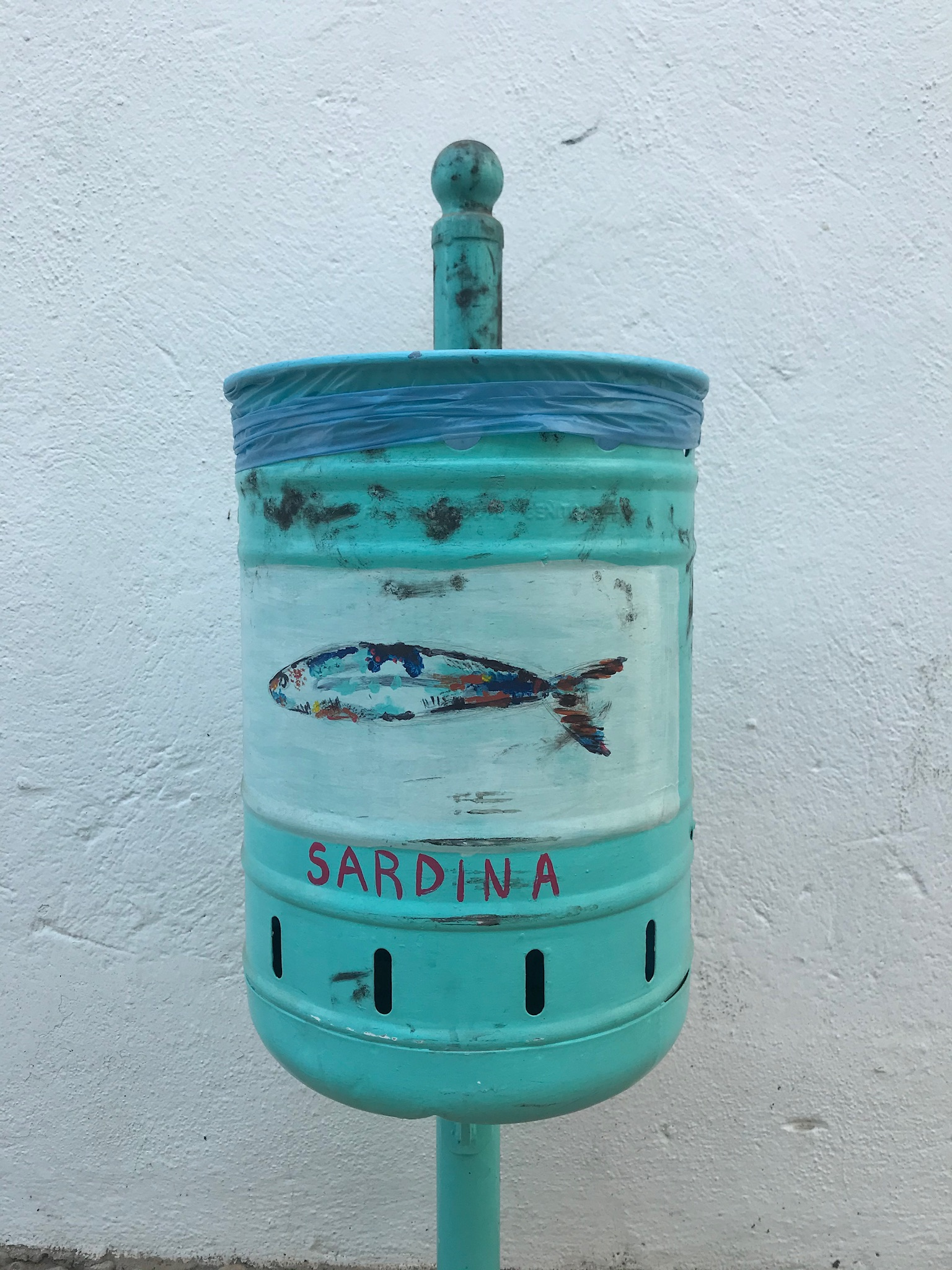
Waste container in Tarifa, Spain

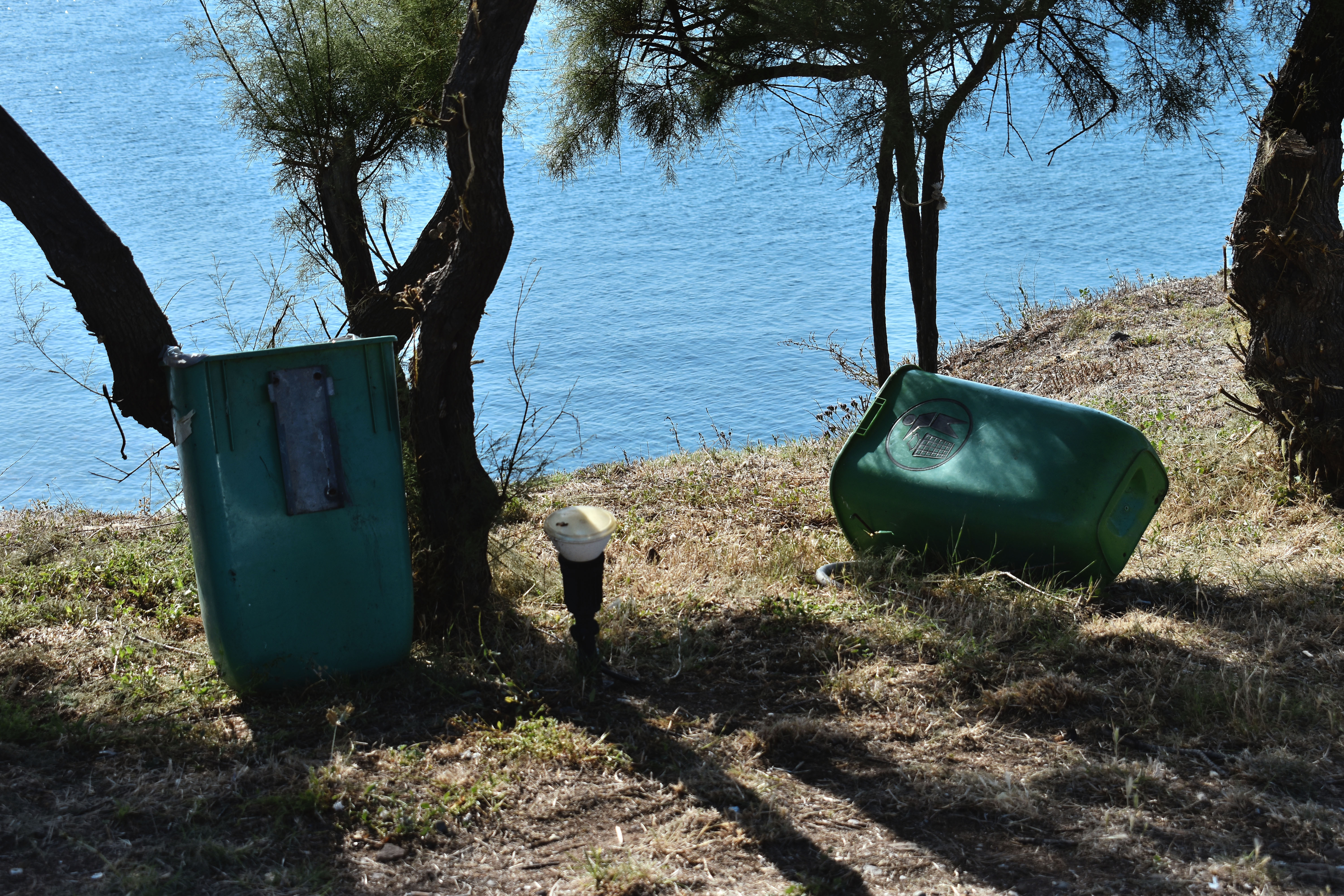
Waste containers in Greece

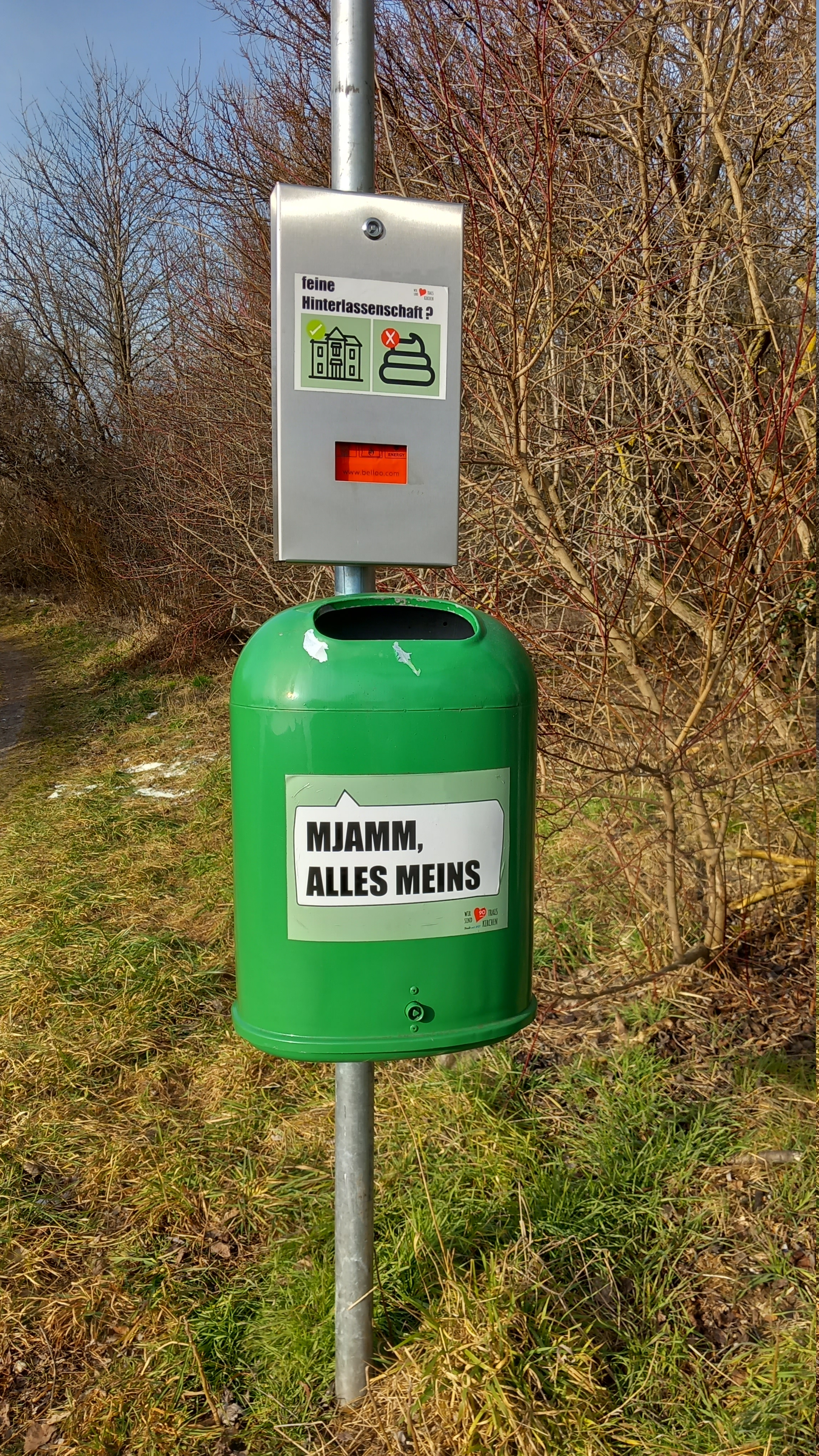
A public waste container with a saying in Traiskirchen, Austria

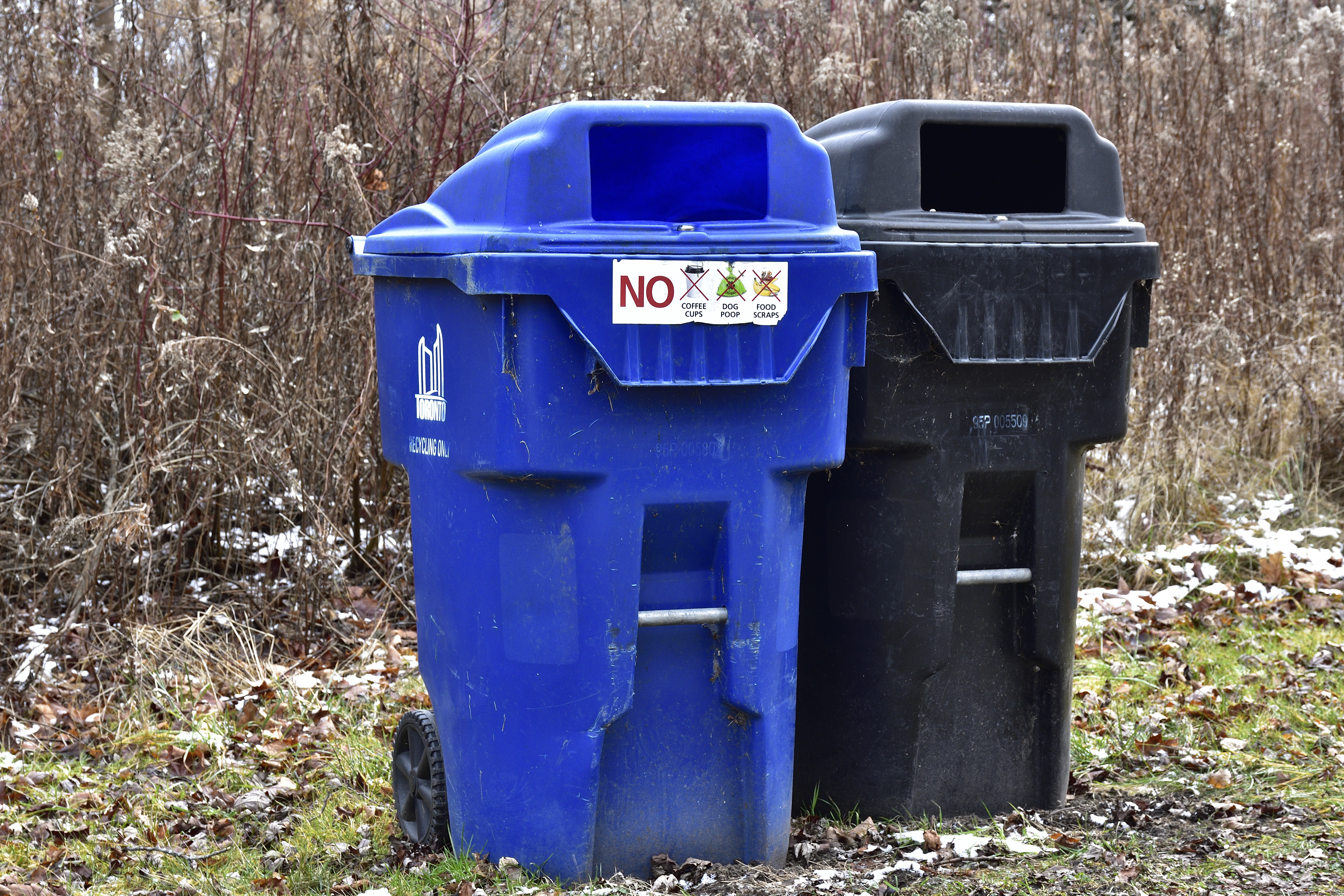
A recycling bin (blue) and garbage disposal bin (black) available to patrons in a Municipal Park within Toronto, ON

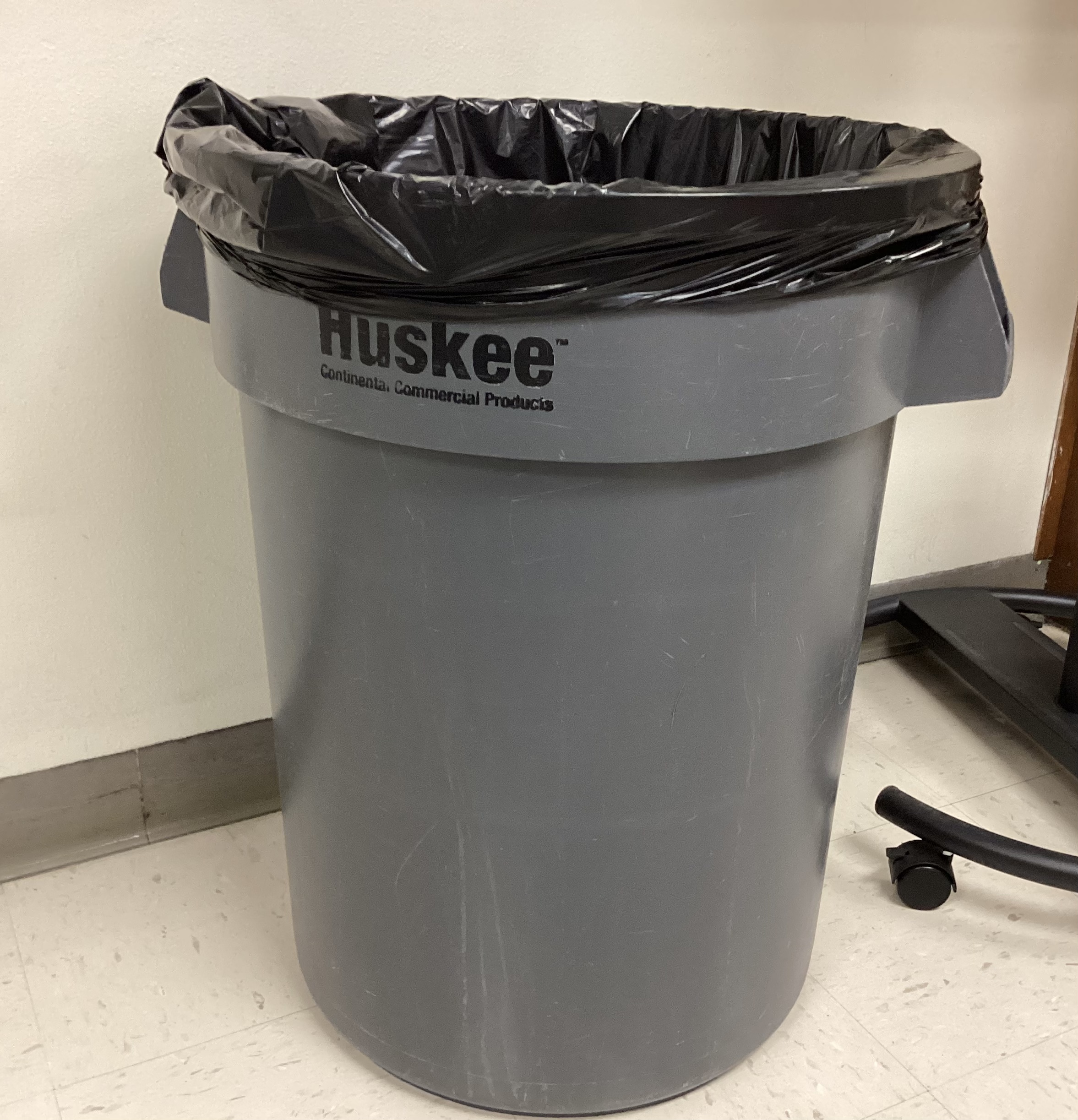
Waste container typically used in American public schools.

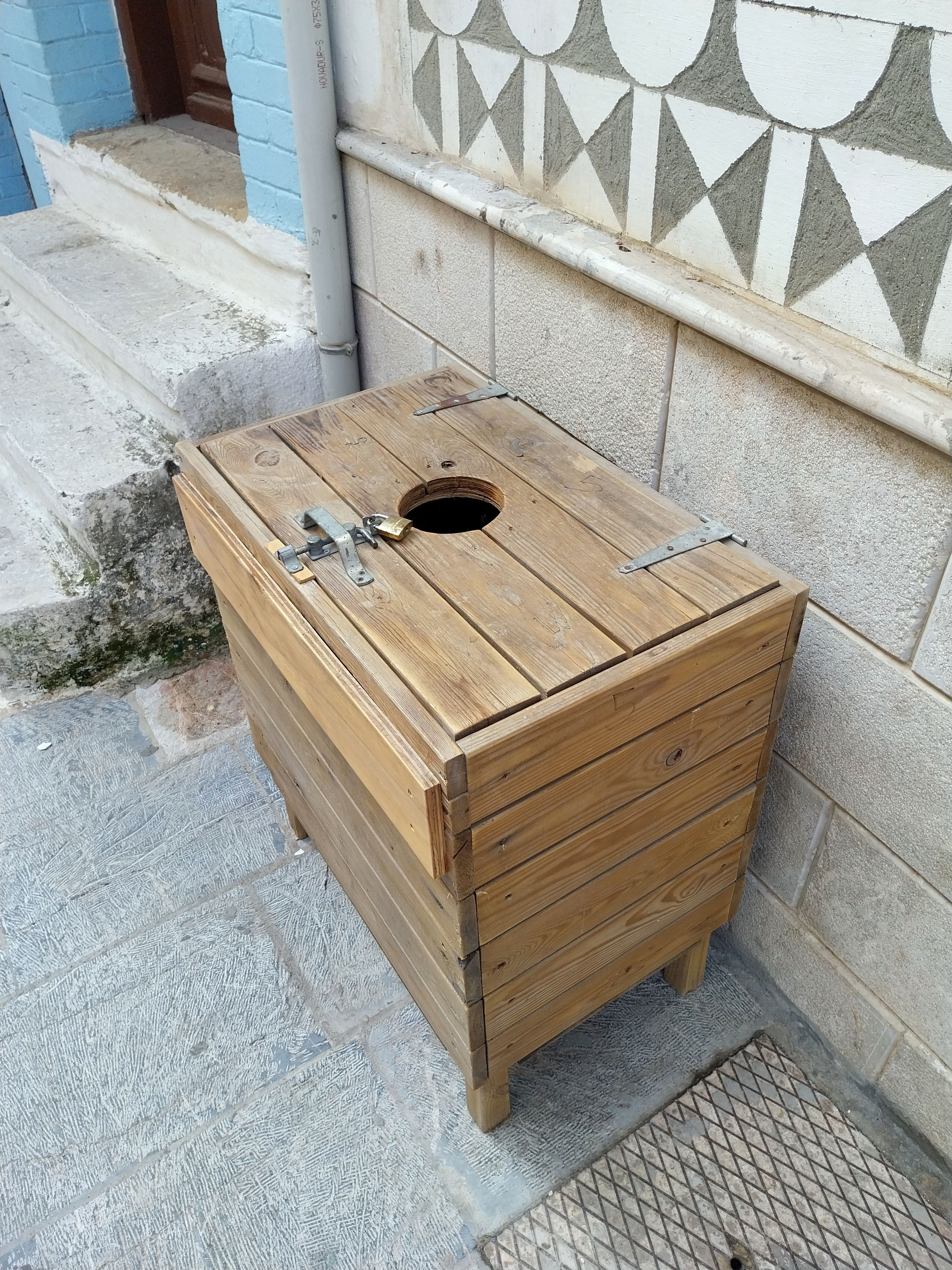
Garbage can in Pyrgi (Chios). The cover is locked to prevent inserting large items.

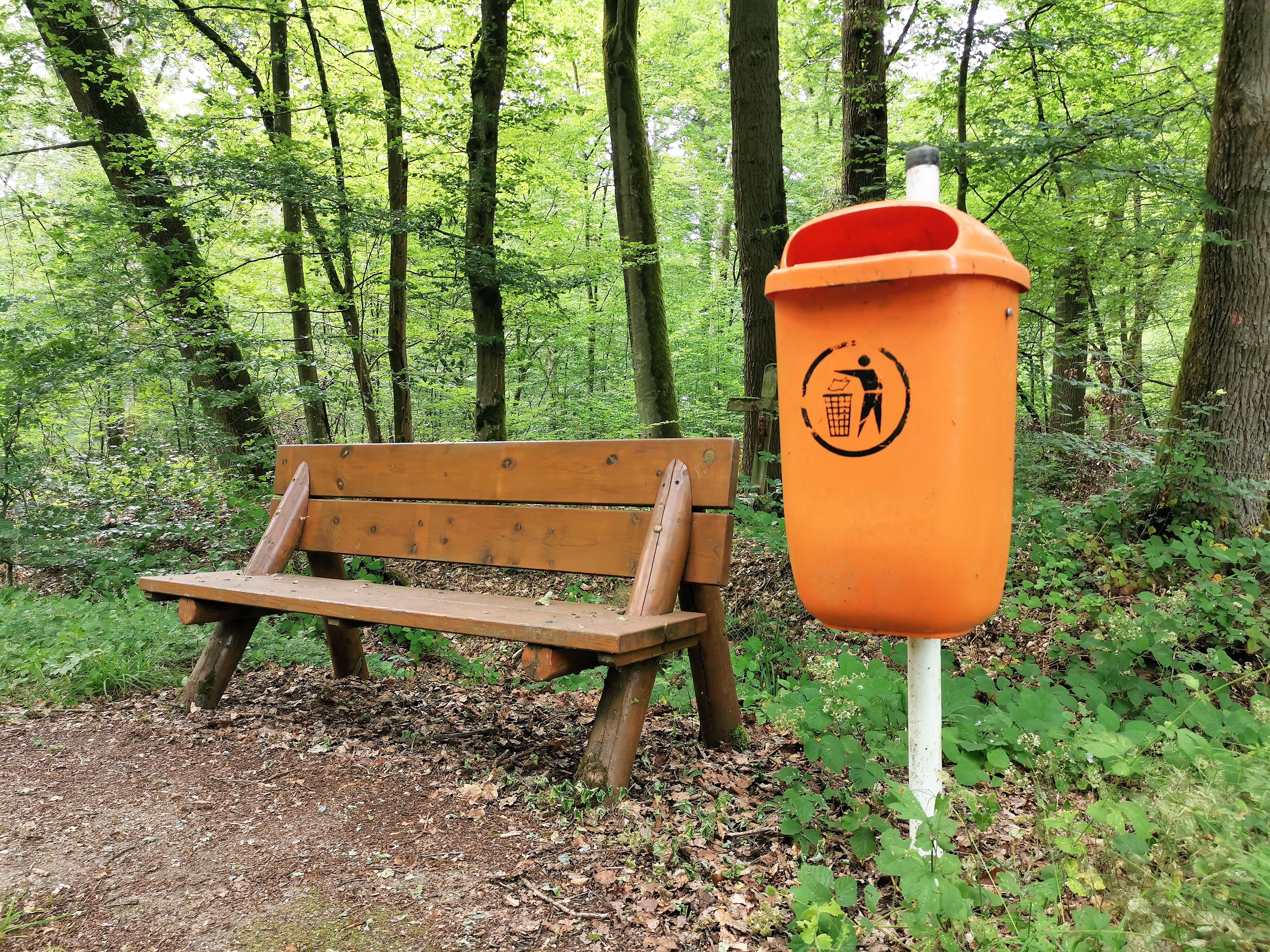
Waste container next to bench in Bivange, Luxembourg

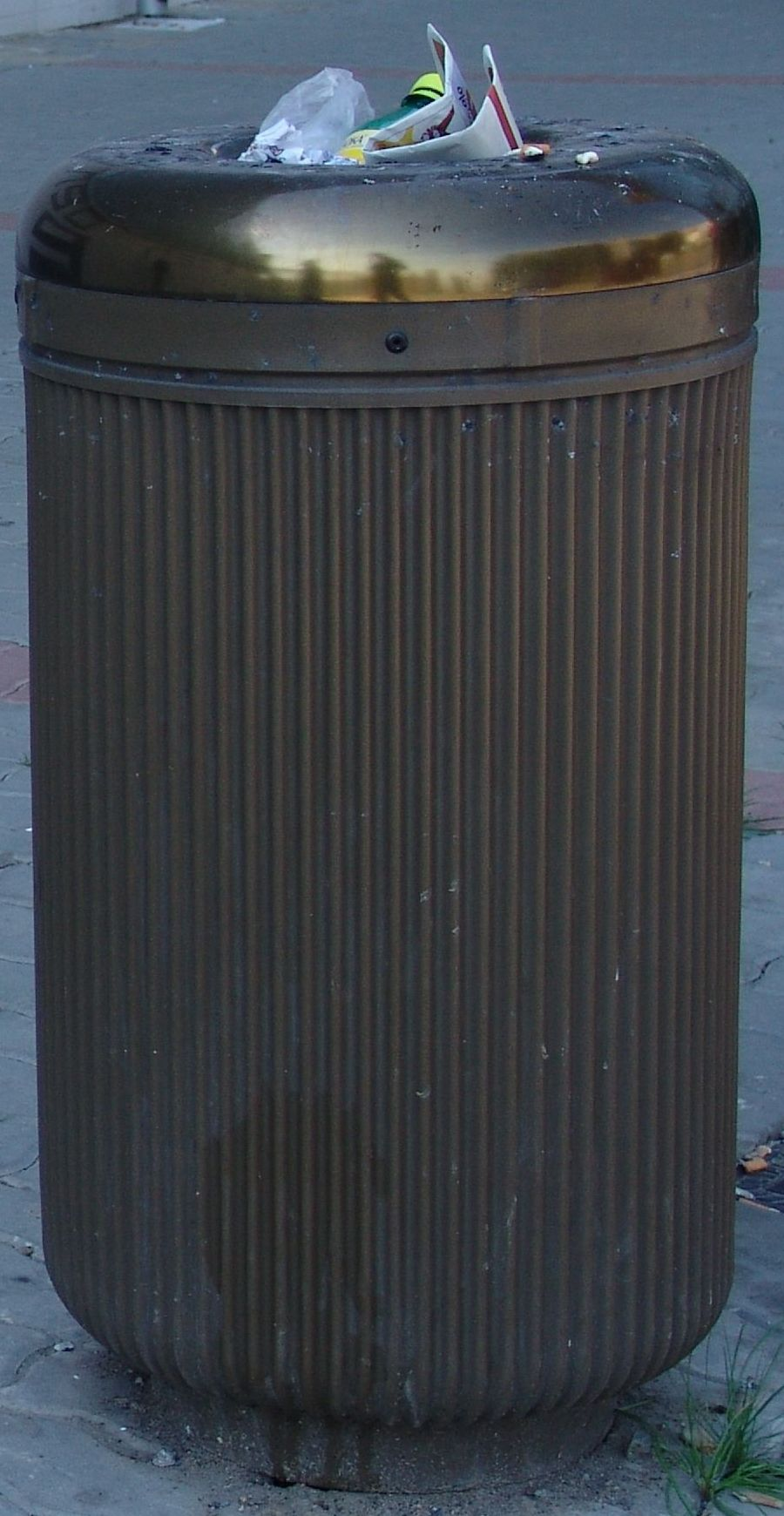
Waste container made by JCDecaux

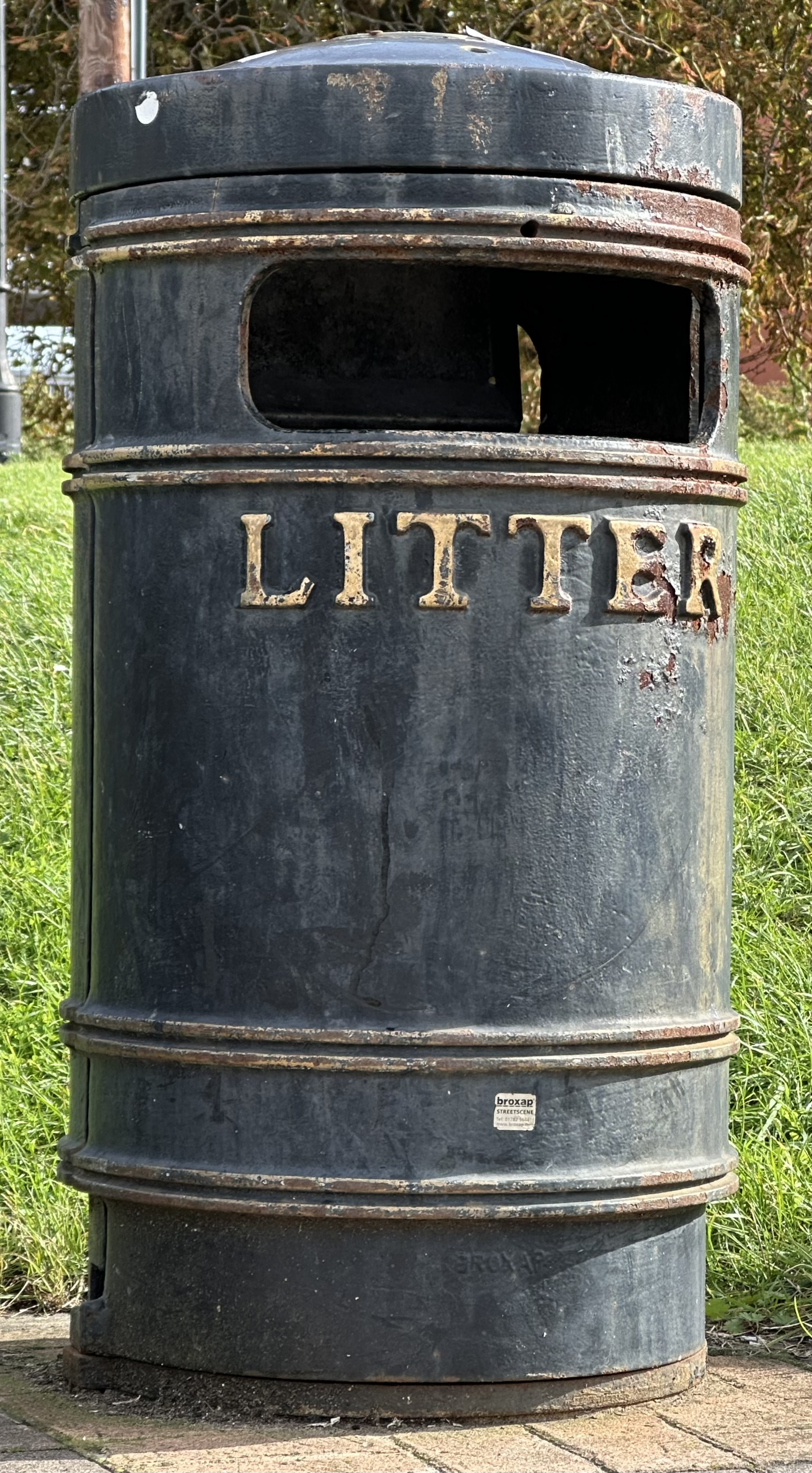
A cylindrical litter bin in Chatham, Kent, England

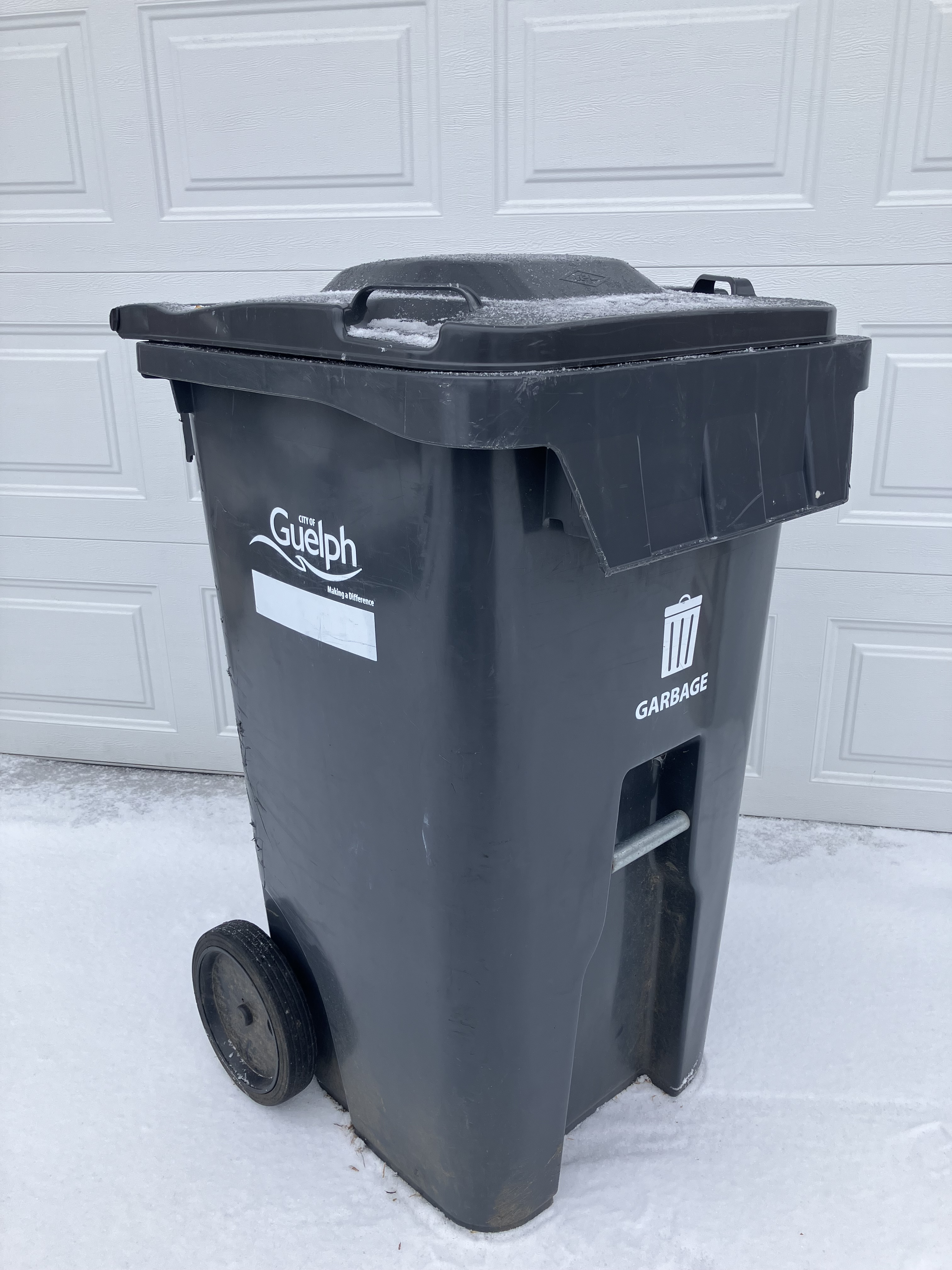
A residential garbage bin with wheels in Guelph, Ontario, Canada

Public bin for dog feces in England

Trash can with a witty saying in Vienna, Austria (translated: I dream of trash!)

== See also ==
- Bin bug
- Compost
- Oscar the Grouch
- Pot farming
- Push the Talking Trash Can
- Recycling bin
- Roll-off (dumpster)
- Waste management
