= File 13 =

Euphemism for trash can

"File 13" is a euphemism for the trash can. The phrase is especially used in the U.S. military, and is less common outside of the United States. In the United Kingdom, for instance, the expression "round file" or "circular file" is more common (in reference to trash cans typically being round). Many Unix-like operating systems have a similar reference known as /dev/null. Expressions such as "I'll place that memo in file 13" are often heard in offices as a joking way of saying, "I'm going to throw away that memo."

== History ==
The first known citation of "file 13" was in 1942.

== Usage in popular culture ==
File 13 is one of the simple games distributed in Dragon magazine. In this board game, players assume the roles of game publishers and each attempts to develop and market "hot item" games before the others.

There is a song by the band AFI called "File 13", on the album Very Proud of Ya, which contains the lyric, "Someone should throw me away/Feel like a garbage can."

File 13 was used as a band moniker by Doug "Double Dee" DiFranco of Double Dee and Steinski and record producer David Witz when they released a 12" single on Profile Records in 1984 called "Taste So Good." The track was built with samples from phone sex tapes and too racy for radio airplay although it was a minor hit in dance clubs. Witz revived the File 13 name again in 1988 for a 12" single called "Party Line" also on Profile Records. This track similarly used samples recorded from party lines which were fairly common in older telephone systems. This track failed to chart or sell well and Witz retired the File 13 name for his dance tracks.

In the band A-ha's music video for "Take On Me", the band is depicted as characters in a comic book which is being read in a cafe by the female protagonist. In the video, the comic book comes to life and she is pulled into its world. The waitress at the cafe, thinking she has left without paying, angrily crumples the comic book up and throws it in the trash. Subsequent to this, the band and the girl are pursued in the comic book world by sinister characters in hard hats that have the number "13" printed on them.

== See also ==
- Bit bucket
- Memory hole
- Waste container metaphors
