= Gujarati people =

Indo-Aryan ethnolinguistic group

Gujaratis
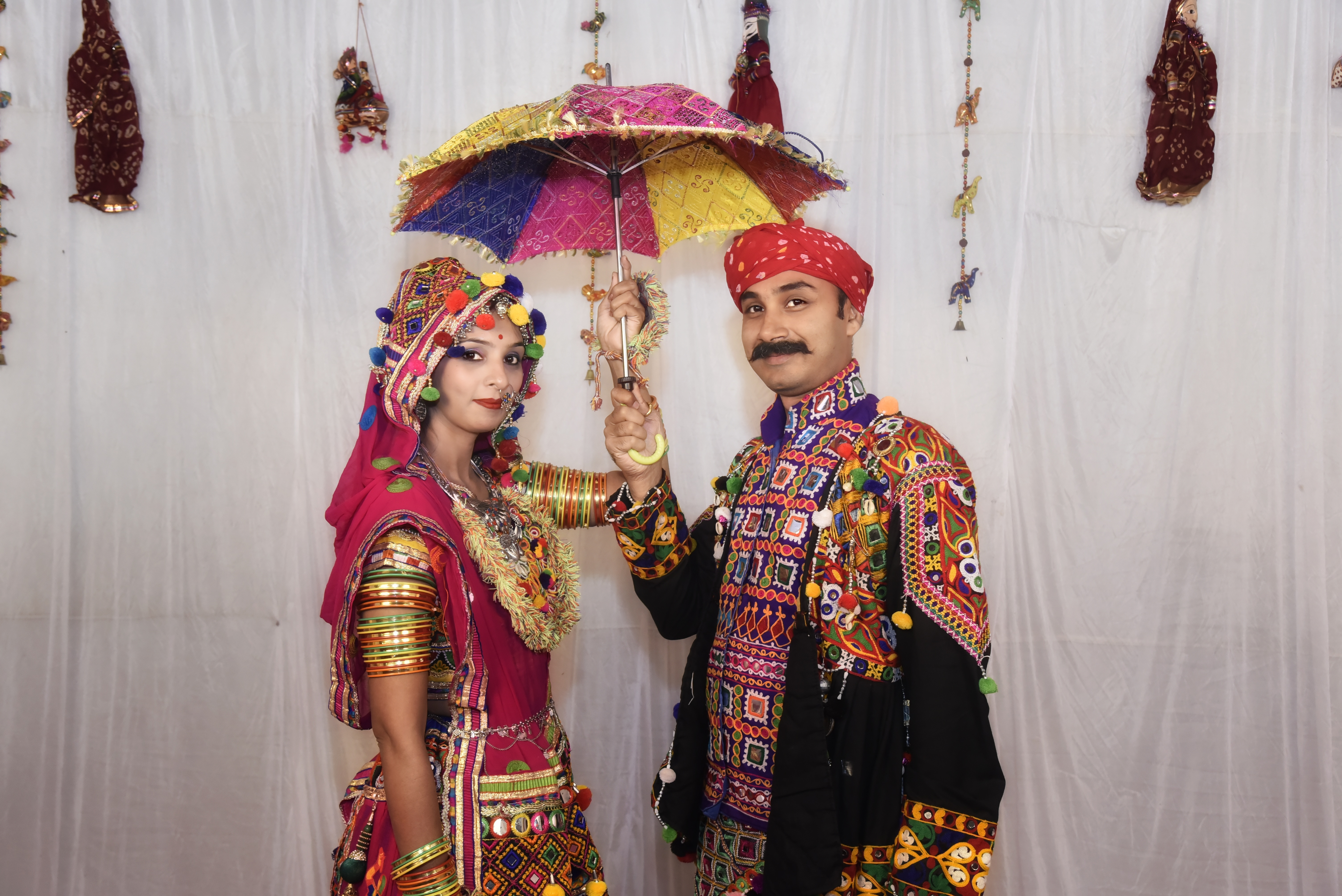
- Gujaratis in traditional garba attire

Total population
- c. 60 million

Regions with significant populations
- India: 55,492,554
- United States: 455,292
- Canada: 209,410 (Note: Statistic includes all speakers of the Gujarati language, as many multi-generation individuals do not speak the language as a mother tongue, but instead as a second or third language.)
- United Kingdom: 189,000
- Australia: 81,334
- New Zealand: 22,200

Languages
- Gujarati

Religion
- Majority: Hinduism; Minority: Islam; Jainism

Related ethnic groups
- Saurashtra people; Kutchi people; other Indo-Aryan peoples

The Gujarati people, or Gujaratis, are an Indo-Aryan ethnolinguistic group native to the Indian state of Gujarat. They primarily speak Gujarati, an Indo-Aryan language. Gujaratis have diaspora across India as well as in a large number of countries around the world.

== Geographical locations ==
Despite significant migration primarily for economic reasons, most Gujaratis in India live in the state of Gujarat in Western India. Gujaratis also form a significant part of the populations in the neighbouring metropolis of Mumbai and union territory of Dadra and Nagar Haveli and Daman and Diu, formerly colonial possessions of Portugal. There are very large Gujarati immigrant communities in other parts of India, most notably in Mumbai, Pune, Delhi, Kolkata, Chennai, Bangalore and other cities like Kochi. All throughout history. Gujaratis have earned a reputation as merchants, industrialists and business entrepreneurs and have therefore been at forefront of migrations all over the world, particularly to regions that were part of the British Empire such as Fiji, Hong Kong, Malaya, Singapore, East Africa, and South Africa. Diasporas and transnational networks in many of these countries date back to more than a century. In recent decades, larger numbers of Gujaratis have migrated to English-speaking countries such as the United States (especially New Jersey), United Kingdom, Australia, New Zealand, and Canada.

== History ==
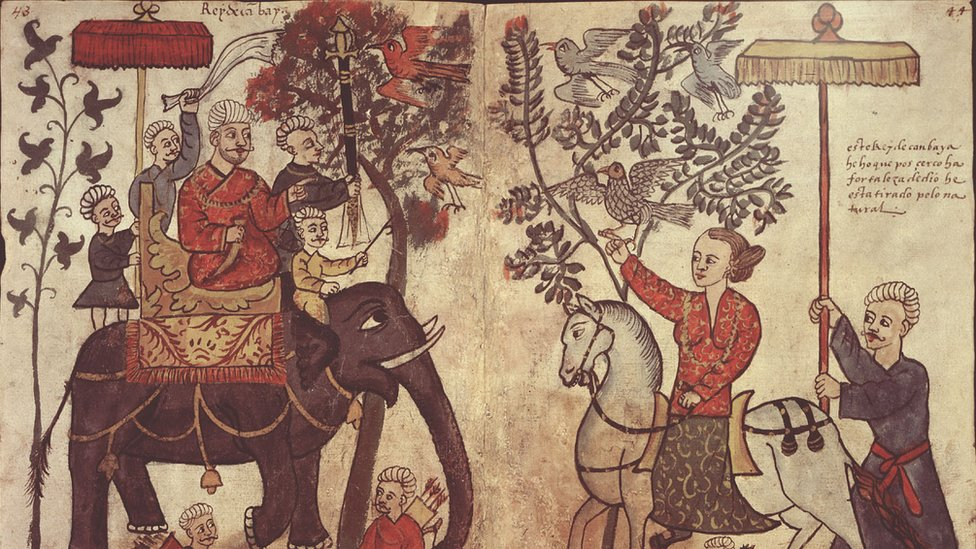
The king of Cambay (in present-day Gujarat) from "Figurae variae Asiae et Africae," a 16th-century Portuguese manuscript in the Casanatense Library in Rome (Codex Casanatense 1889)

In anthropological surveys conducted in India about 60% of the people claim that their community is a migrant to their state or region. In Gujarat that number is around 70%. In the state, 124 Hindu communities out of 186 claim a migrant past. For example, the Audichya Brahmins claim migration from present day Uttar Pradesh. With Muslims in Gujarat, 67 out of 86 communities claim a migrant past.

Early European travellers like Ludovico di Varthema (15th century) travelled to Gujarat and wrote on the people of Gujarat. He noted that Jainism had a strong presence in Gujarat and opined that Gujaratis were deprived of their kingdom by Mughals because of their kind heartedness. His description of Gujaratis was:

...a certain race which eats nothing that has blood, never kills any living things... and these people are neither moors nor heathens... if they were baptized, they would all be saved by the virtue of their works, for they never do to others what they would not do unto them.

In 1790 and 1791, an epidemic devastated numerous parts of Gujarat during which 100,000 Gujaratis were killed in Surat alone.

An outbreak of bubonic plague in 1812 has been claimed to have killed about half the Gujarati population.

=== Gujarati mercantile history ===
Ports on the western coast of India have been engaged in trade for millennia. During the medieval and early modern period, ports in Gujarat such as Diu, Surat, Mandavi, Cambay, and Porbandar became important. Gujarati merchants operating from these ports operated not only in the Indian Ocean in the west but also in Southeast Asia. It is estimated that there were 1000 Gujarati merchants resident in Malacca in fifteenth century with a thousand others operating in the Bay of Bengal and Indonesian archipelago. Most of the Gujarati traders were Muslims but there were Hindu and Jains too despite religious prohibitions. Gujarati merchants operating in Southeast Asia were primarily involved exporting India cotton to Southeast Asia in exchange for spices from the islands which were then exported to Persia. Surat was the principal port for this trade. Gujaratis played a big part in the Indian ocean trade. The Portuguese explorer Vasco de Gama noted presence of Muslim and Hindu navigators and merchants from Gujarat in Zanzibar and Pemba and along the East Africa coast in towns such as Kilwa, Bagamoyo, Mombasa and Malindi. International trade by Gujarati merchants increased with the advent of the Gujarat Sultanate at the beginning of the 1400s. The trade involved gold, ivory and slaves from Africa in exchange for cotton and glass beads from India. The important Gujarati traders active in the Indian Ocean trade at different periods of history included Jains; Hindu Bhatias and Lohanas; Muslim Khojas, Memons, and Bohras; and the Parsee communities. The Jains were active during the Solannki period trading with Arabian and Red sea ports. The Portuguese also preferred Jains to the Arab traders.

== Social stratification ==
Orthodox Gujarati society, which was mercantile by nature, was historically organised along ethno-religious lines and shaped into existence on the strength of its Mahajan ("guild assemblies"), and for its institution of Nagarsheth ("head of the guild assembly"); a 16th-century Mughal system akin to medieval European guilds which self-regulated the mercantile affairs of multi-ethnic, multi-religious communities in the Gujarati bourgeoisie long before municipal state politics was introduced. Historically, Gujaratis belonging to numerous faiths and castes, thrived in an inclusive climate surcharged by a degree of cultural syncretism, in which Hindus and Jains dominated occupations such as shroffs and brokers whereas, Muslims, Hindus and Parsis largely dominated sea shipping trade. This led to religious interdependence, tolerance, assimilation and community cohesion ultimately becoming the hallmark of modern-day Gujarati society.

=== Religion ===
The Gujarati people are predominantly Hindu. There are also minority communities of Muslims, Jains, Christians, Sikhs, Buddhists, Parsis, Jews, and followers of the Baháʼí Faith amongst the Gujaratis.

=== Hindu communities ===
The major communities in Gujarat are farmers and livestock herders (such as Patidar, Koli, Rabari, Bharvad, Ahir), traders (such as Bania, Bhatia, Soni), sailor and seafood exporters (such as Kharwa), artisan and business communities (such as Prajapati, Varaiya, Mochi), Brahmin communities (such as Joshi, Anavil, Nagar, Modh, Shrimali), genealogists (such as Barot), Kshatriya communities (such as Koli Thakor, Bhanushali, Karadia, Nadoda, Jadeja, Dabhi, Chudasama, Maher, Lohana), Tribal communities (such as Bhils, Meghwal, Gamit, Konkani, varli) and Devipujak (such as Dataniya, Dantani, Chunara, Patni).

=== Muslim communities ===
The majority of Gujarati Muslims are Sunni Muslim. Minority communities include Twelver, Nizari Ismailis, Daudi Bohra, Khoja, Pathans, Shaikhs, Maliks.

== Diaspora ==
Gujaratis have a long tradition of seafaring and a history of overseas migration to foreign lands, to Yemen Oman Bahrain, Kuwait, Zanzibar and other countries in the Persian Gulf since a mercantile culture resulted naturally from the state's proximity to the Arabian Sea. The countries with the largest Gujarati diaspora populations are Pakistan, United Kingdom, United States, Canada and many countries in Southern and East Africa. Globally, Gujaratis are estimated to constitute around 33% of the Indian diaspora worldwide and can be found in 129 of 190 countries listed as sovereign nations by the United Nations. Non Resident Gujaratis (NRGs) maintain active links with the homeland in the form of business, remittance, philanthropy, and through their political contribution to state governed domestic affairs.

Gujarati parents in the diaspora are not comfortable with the possibility of their language not surviving them. In a study, 80% of Malayali parents felt that "children would be better off with English," compared to 36% of Kannada parents and only 19% of Gujarati parents.

=== Pakistan ===
Significant Gujarati communities existed here before 1947 Partition of India. Many of them migrated after the Partition of India and subsequent creation of Pakistan in 1947. These Pakistani Gujaratis belong mainly to the Ismāʿīlī, Khoja, Dawoodi Bohra, Chundrigar, Charotar Sunni Vohra, Khatri Muslims Kutchi Memons and Khatiawari Memons; however, many Gujaratis are also a part of Pakistan's small Hindu community. A number of them belong to the Dalit community.

Estimated to number 3.5 million they virtually all live in Karachi. Community leaders estimate that it roughly amounts to some 15% of Karachi's total population, while also highlighting the dire state of the Gujarati language in the country, with only two newspapers, Vatan and Millat, still serving the community.

=== United States ===
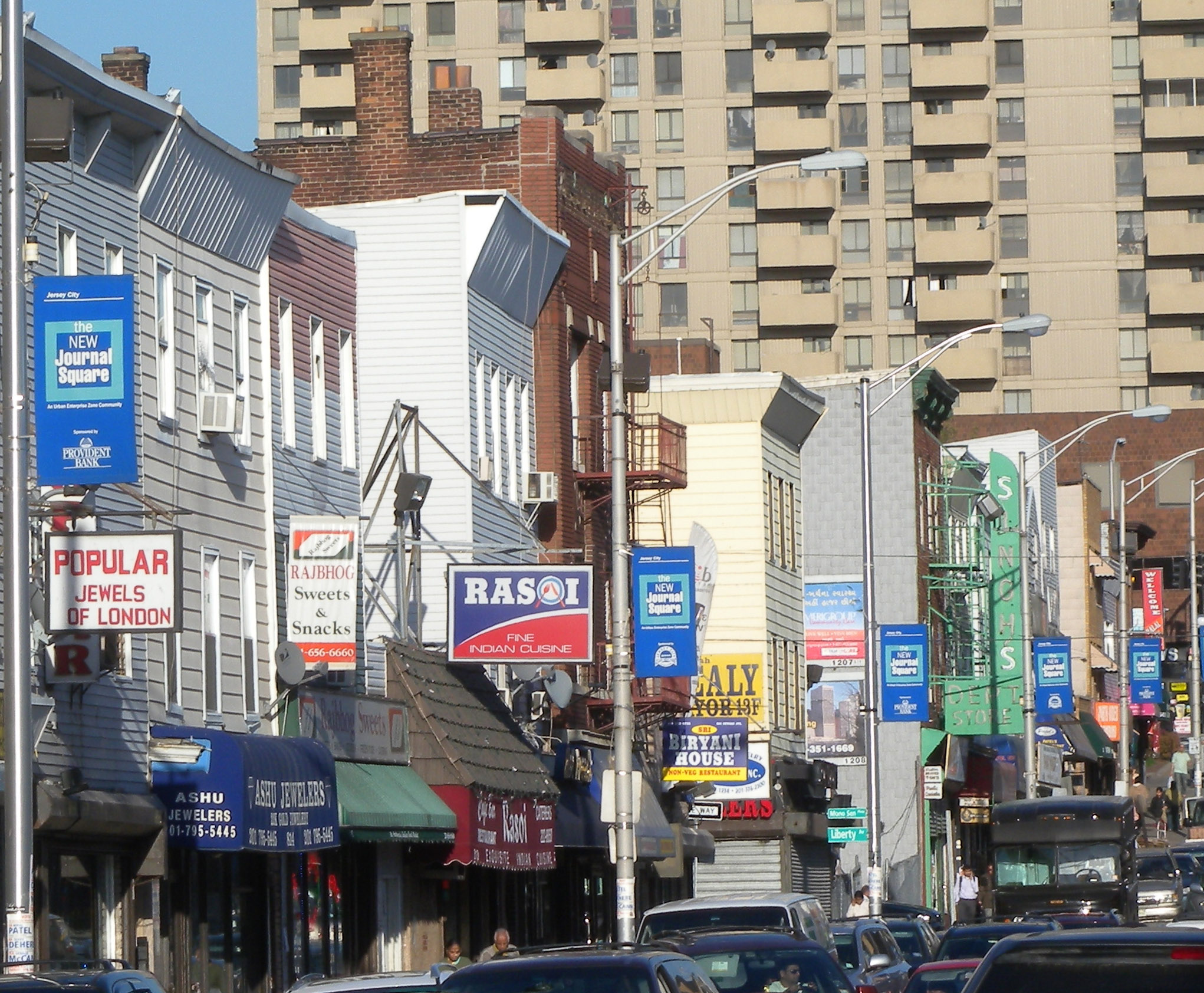
Gujaratis have achieved a high demographic profile in many urban districts worldwide, notably in India Square, or Little Gujarat, in Bombay, Jersey City, New Jersey, USA, within the New York City Metropolitan Area, as large-scale immigration from India continues into New York, with the largest metropolitan Gujarati population outside of India.

The United States has the second-largest Gujarati diaspora after Pakistan. The highest concentration of the population of over 200,000 is in the New York City Metropolitan Area, notably in the growing Gujarati diasporic center of India Square in Jersey City, New Jersey, and Edison in Middlesex County in Central New Jersey. Significant immigration from India to the United States started after the landmark Immigration and Nationality Act of 1965. Early immigrants after 1965 were highly educated professionals. Since US immigration laws allow sponsoring immigration of parents, children and particularly siblings on the basis of family reunion, the numbers rapidly swelled. A number of Gujarati are twice or thrice-migrants because they came directly from the former British colonies of East Africa or from East Africa via Great Britain respectively. Given the Gujarati propensity for business enterprise, a number of them opened shops and motels. While they may make up only around 0.1% of the population in the United States, Gujarati Americans control over 40% of the hospitality market in the country, for a combined net worth of over US$40 billion and employing over one million employees. Gujaratis, especially the Patidar Samaj, also dominate as franchisees of fast food restaurant chains such as Subway and Dunkin' Donuts.

=== Europe ===
==== United Kingdom ====
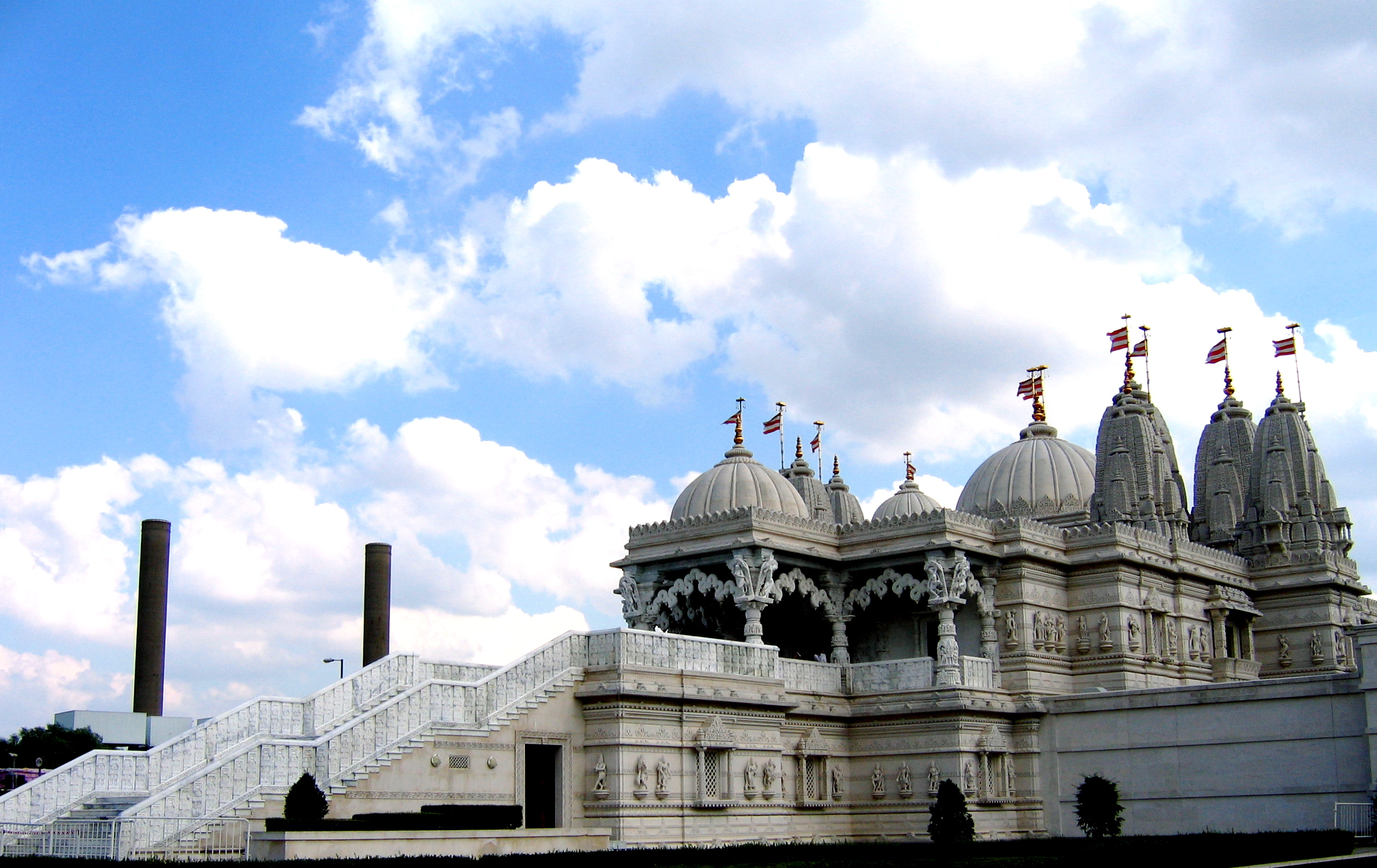
The Swaminarayan Temple in Neasden, London, the largest Hindu temple in Europe

The third largest overseas diaspora of Gujaratis, after Pakistan and United States, is in the United Kingdom. At a population of around 600,000 Gujaratis form almost more than half of the Indian community who live in the UK (1.2 million). Gujaratis first went to the UK in the 19th century with the establishment of the British Raj in India. Prominent members of this community such as Shyamji Krishna Varma played a vital role in exerting political pressure upon colonial powers during the Indian independence movement.

Gujaratis in Britain are regarded as affluent middle-class peoples who have assimilated into the milieu of British society. They are celebrated for revolutionising the corner shop, and energising the British economy which changed Britain's antiquated retail laws forever. Demographically, Hindus form a majority along with a significant number of Jains and Muslims, and smaller numbers of Gujarati Christians. They are predominantly settled in metropolitan areas like Greater London, East Midlands, West Midlands, Lancashire and Yorkshire. Cities with significant Gujarati populations include Leicester and London boroughs of Harrow, Barnet and Brent. There is also a small, but vibrant Gujarati-speaking Parsi community of Zoroastrians present in the country, dating back to the bygone era of Dadabhai Navroji, Shapurji Saklatvala and Pherozeshah Mehta. Both Hindus and Muslims have established caste or community associations, temples, and mosques to cater for the needs of their respective communities. A well known temple popular with Gujaratis is the BAPS Swaminarayan Temple in Neasden, London. A popular mosque that caters for the Gujarati Muslim community in Leicester is the Masjid Umar. Leicester has a Jain Temple that is also the headquarters of Jain Samaj Europe.

Gujarati Hindus in the UK have maintained many traditions from their homeland. The community remains religious with more than 100 temples catering for their religious needs. All major Hindu festivals such as Navratri, Dassara, and Diwali are celebrated with a lot of enthusiasm even from the generations brought up in UK. Gujarati Hindus also maintain their caste affiliation to some extent with most major castes having their own community association in each population centre with significant Gujarati population such as Leicester and London suburbs. Patidars form the largest community in the diaspora including Kutch Leva Patels, followed closely by Lohanas of Saurashtra origin. Gujarati Rajputs from various regional backgrounds are affiliated with several independent British organisations dependent on caste such as Shree Maher Samaj UK, and the Gujarati Arya Kshatriya Mahasabha-UK.

Endogamy remains important to Gujaratis in UK with the existence of matrimonial services specifically dedicated to their community. The Gujarati Muslim society in the UK have kept the custom of Jamat Bandi, literally meaning communal solidarity. This system is the traditional expression of communal solidarity. It is designed to regulate the affairs of the community and apply sanctions against infractions of the communal code. Gujarati Muslim communities, such as the Ismāʿīlī, Khoja, Dawoodi Bohra, Sunni Bohra, and Memon have caste associations, known as jamats that run mosques and community centers for their respective communities.

==== Belgium ====
Two Gujarati business communities, the Palanpuri Jains and the Kathiawadi Patels from Surat, have come to dominate the diamond industry of Belgium. They have largely displaced the Orthodox Jewish community which previously dominated this industry in Belgium.

==== Portugal ====
The 1961 takeover of Portuguese Goa by India made life difficult for the Indian population in the then Portuguese colony of Mozambique. The independence of Mozambique like in other African countries led to many Gujaratis to move to Portugal. Many Hindu Gujaratis have moved from Portugal to Great Britain since the 1990s.

=== Canada ===
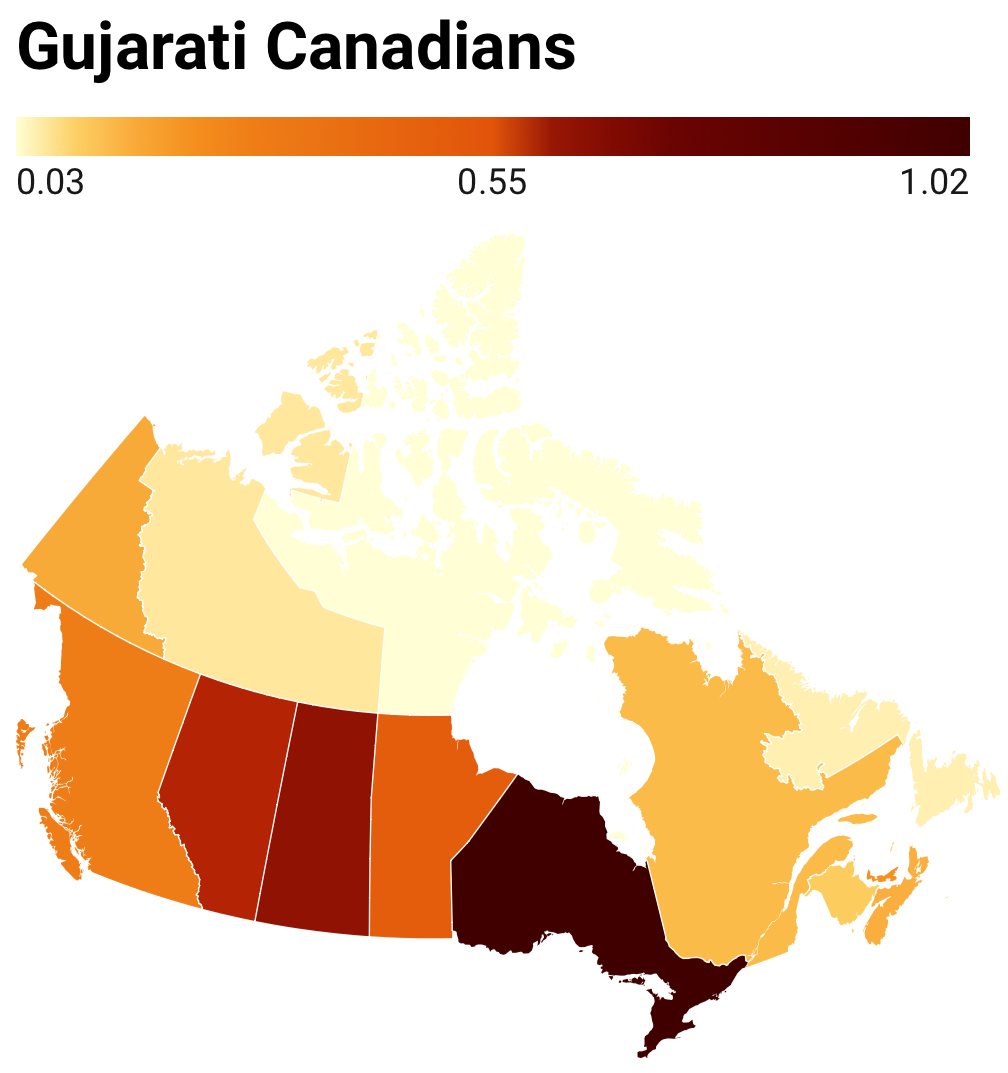
Gujarati percent in Canadian province/territory, 2021 census

Canada, just like its southern neighbour, is home to a large Gujarati community. As per the 2021 Canadian census, Gujarati Canadians number approximately 210,000 and account for roughly 0.6% of Canada's population. The majority of them live in Toronto and its suburbs - home to the second largest Gujarati community in North America, after the New York Metropolitan Area. Gujarati Hindus are the second largest linguistic/religious group in Canada's Indian community after Punjabi Sikhs, and Toronto is home to the largest Navratri raas garba festival in North America. The Muslim Ismaili Khoja form a significant part of the Canadian diaspora estimated to be about 80,000 in numbers overall. Most of them arrived in Canada in the 1970s as either refugees or immigrants from Uganda and other countries of East Africa.

Gujarati Canadians by province and territory (1991−2021)
| Province/ territory | 2021 | | 2016 | | 2011 | | 2006 | | 2001 | | 1996 | | 1991 | |
| Province/ territory | Pop. | % | Pop. | % | Pop. | % | Pop. | % | Pop. | % | Pop. | % | Pop. | % |
|---|---|---|---|---|---|---|---|---|---|---|---|---|---|---|
| Ontario | 143,240 | 1.02% | 103,890 | 0.78% | 87,805 | 0.69% | 76,910 | 0.64% | 53,485 | 0.47% | 40,605 | 0.38% | 32,110 | 0.32% |
| Alberta | 24,780 | 0.59% | 18,005 | 0.45% | 11,875 | 0.33% | 9,170 | 0.28% | 8,685 | 0.3% | 8,025 | 0.3% | 6,545 | 0.26% |
| British; Columbia | 14,340 | 0.29% | 11,500 | 0.25% | 9,325 | 0.21% | 10,410 | 0.26% | 10,520 | 0.27% | 10,080 | 0.27% | 8,120 | 0.25% |
| Quebec | 10,640 | 0.13% | 7,950 | 0.1% | 7,485 | 0.1% | 7,155 | 0.1% | 7,005 | 0.1% | 5,450 | 0.08% | 4,040 | 0.06% |
| Saskatchewan | 6,965 | 0.63% | 3,320 | 0.31% | 765 | 0.08% | 320 | 0.03% | 310 | 0.03% | 385 | 0.04% | 405 | 0.04% |
| Manitoba | 6,535 | 0.5% | 3,905 | 0.31% | 1,460 | 0.12% | 960 | 0.08% | 550 | 0.05% | 480 | 0.04% | 735 | 0.07% |
| Nova; Scotia | 1,475 | 0.15% | 240 | 0.03% | 105 | 0.01% | 230 | 0.03% | 115 | 0.01% | 150 | 0.02% | 140 | 0.02% |
| New; Brunswick | 765 | 0.1% | 110 | 0.02% | 105 | 0.01% | 175 | 0.02% | 85 | 0.01% | 85 | 0.01% | 105 | 0.01% |
| Prince Edward; Island | 325 | 0.22% | 5 | 0% | 5 | 0% | 0 | 0% | 0 | 0% | 0 | 0% | 0 | 0% |
| Newfoundland and Labrador | 255 | 0.05% | 70 | 0.01% | 50 | 0.01% | 50 | 0.01% | 85 | 0.02% | 70 | 0.01% | 110 | 0.02% |
| Yukon | 65 | 0.16% | 50 | 0.14% | 0 | 0% | 0 | 0% | 0 | 0% | 0 | 0% | 0 | 0% |
| Northwest; Territories | 25 | 0.06% | 15 | 0.04% | 15 | 0.04% | 20 | 0.05% | 10 | 0.03% | 0 | 0% | 10 | 0.02% |
| Nunavut | 10 | 0.03% | 10 | 0.03% | 5 | 0.02% | 0 | 0% | 10 | 0.04% | N/A | N/A | N/A | N/A |
| Canada | 209,410 | 0.58% | 149,045 | 0.43% | 118,950 | 0.36% | 105,395 | 0.34% | 80,835 | 0.27% | 65,345 | 0.23% | 54,210 | 0.2% |

Religious breakdown of Gujarati Canadians (2021) (Note: Religious breakdown proportions based on "Gujarati" ethnic or cultural origin response on the 2021 census.)
1. Hinduism (75.6%)
2. Islam (16.0%)
3. Irreligion (3.10%)
4. Christianity (1.10%)
5. Sikhism (0.40%)
6. Others (3.80%)

Gujarati Canadian demography by religion
| Religious group | 2021 | |
| Religious group | Pop. | % |
|---|---|---|
| Hinduism | 27,950 | 75.6% |
| Islam | 5,915 | 16% |
| Irreligion | 1,140 | 3.08% |
| Christianity | 425 | 1.15% |
| Sikhism | 145 | 0.39% |
| Buddhism | 15 | 0.04% |
| Indigenous spirituality | 10 | 0.03% |
| Judaism | 0 | 0% |
| Other | 1,365 | 3.69% |
| Total Gujarati Canadian responses | 36,970 | 17.65% |
| Total Gujarati Canadian population | 209,410 | 100% |

=== East Africa ===
Former British colonies in East Africa had many residents of South Asian descent. The primary immigration was mainly from Gujarat and to a lesser extent from Punjab. They were brought there by the British Empire from India to do clerical work in Imperial service, or unskilled and semi-skilled manual labour such as construction or farm work. In the 1890s, 32,000 labourers from British India were brought to the then British East African colonies under indentured labour contracts to work on the construction of the Uganda Railway that started in the Kenyan port city of Mombasa and ended in Kisumu on Kenyan side of Lake Victoria. Most of the surviving Indians returned home, but 6,724 individuals decided to remain in the African Great Lakes after the line's completion.

Many Asians, particularly the Gujaratis, in these regions were in the trading businesses. They included Gujaratis of all religions as well many of the castes and Quoms. Since the representation of Indians in these occupations was high, stereotyping of Indians in Kenya, Uganda, and Tanganyika as shopkeepers was common. A number of people worked for the British run banks. They also worked in skilled labour occupations, as managers, teachers and administrators. Gujarati and other South Asians had significant influence on the economy, constituting 1% of the population while receiving a fifth of the national income. For example, in Uganda, the Mehta and Madhvani families controlled the bulk of the manufacturing businesses. Gated ethnic communities served elite healthcare and schooling services. Additionally, the tariff system in Uganda had historically been oriented toward the economic interests of South Asian traders. One of the oldest Jain overseas diaspora was of Gujarat. Their number was estimated at 45,000 at the independence of the East African countries in the early 1960s. Most members of this community belonged to Gujarati speaking Halari Visa Oshwal Jain community originally from the Jamnagar area of Saurashtra.

The countries of East Africa gained independence from Britain in the early 1960s. At that time most Gujarati and other Asians opted to remain as British Subjects. The African politicians at that time accused Asians of economic exploitation and introduced a policy of Africanization. The 1968 Committee on "Africanisation in Commerce and Industry" in Uganda made far-reaching Indophobic proposals. A system of work permits and trade licences was introduced in 1969 to restrict the role of Indians in economic and professional activities. Indians were segregated and discriminated against in all walks of life. During the middle of the 1960s many Asians saw the writing on the wall and started moving either to UK or India. However, restrictive British immigration policies stopped a mass exodus of East African Asians until Idi Amin came to power in 1971. He exploited pre-existing Indophobia and spread propaganda against Indians involving stereotyping and scapegoating the Indian minority. Indians were stereotyped as "only traders" and "inbred" to their profession. Indians were labelled as "dukawallas" (an occupational term that degenerated into an anti-Indian slur during Amin's time), and stereotyped as "greedy, conniving," without any racial identity or loyalty but "always cheating, conspiring and plotting" to subvert Uganda. Amin used this propaganda to justify a campaign of "de-Indianization," eventually resulting in the expulsion and ethnic cleansing of Uganda's Indian minority.

==== Kenya ====
Gujarati and other Indians started moving to the Kenya colony at the end of the 19th century when the British colonial authorities started opening up the country with the laying down of the railroads. A small colony of merchants, however, had existed on the port cities such Mombasa on the Kenyan coast for hundreds of years prior to that. The immigrants who arrived with the British were the first ones to open up businesses in rural Kenya a century ago. These dukanwalas or shopkeepers were mainly Gujarati (Mostly Jains and Hindus and a minority of Muslims). Over the following decades the population, mainly Gujarati but also a sizeable number of Punjabi, increased in size. The population started declining after the independence of Kenya in the 1960s. At that time the majority of Gujaratis opted for British citizenship and eventually moved there, especially to cities like Leicester or London suburbs. Famous Kenyans of Gujarati heritage who contributed greatly to the development of East Africa include Thakkar Bapa, Manu Chandaria,

==== Uganda ====
There is a small community of people of Indian origin living in Uganda, but the community is far smaller than before 1972 when Ugandan ruler Idi Amin expelled most Asians, including Gujaratis. In the late 19th century, mostly Sikhs, were brought on three-year contracts, with the aid of Imperial British contractor Alibhai Mulla Jeevanjee to build the Uganda Railway from Mombasa to Kisumu by 1901, and to Kampala by 1931. Some died, while others returned to India after the end of their contracts, but few chose to stay. They were joined by Gujarati traders called "passenger Indians," both Hindu and Muslim free migrants who came to serve the economic needs of the indentured labourers, and to capitalise on the economic opportunities.

After the 1972 expulsion, most Indians and Gujaratis migrated to the United Kingdom. Due to the efforts of the Aga Khan, many Khoja Nizari Ismaili refugees from Uganda were offered asylum in Canada.

==== Tanzania ====
Indians have a long history in Tanzania starting with the arrival of Gujarati traders in the 19th century. There are currently over 50,000 people of Indian origin in Tanzania. Many of them are traders and they control a sizeable portion of the Tanzanian economy. They came to gradually control the trade in Zanzibar. Many of the buildings constructed then still remain in Stone Town, the focal trading point on the island.

=== South Africa ===
The Indian community in South Africa is more than 150 years old and is concentrated in and around the city of Durban. The vast majority of immigrant pioneer Gujaratis who came in the latter half of the 19th century were passenger Indians who paid for their own travel fare and means of transport to arrive and settle South Africa, in pursuit of fresh trade and career opportunities and as such were treated as British subjects, unlike the fate of a class of Indian indentured labourers who were transported to work on the sugarcane plantations of Natal Colony in dire conditions. Passenger Indians, who initially operated in Durban, expanded inland, to the South African Republic (Transvaal), establishing communities in settlements on the main road between Johannesburg and Durban. After wealthy Gujarati Muslim merchants began experiencing discrimination from repressive colonial legislation in Natal, they sought the help of one young lawyer, Mahatma Gandhi to represent the case of a Memon businessman. Umar Hajee Ahmed Jhaveri was consequently elected the first president of the South African Indian Congress. Indians in South Africa could traditionally be bifurcated as either indentured labourers (largely from Tamil Nadu, with smaller amounts from UP and Bihar) and merchants (exclusively from Gujarat).

Indians have played an important role in the anti-apartheid movement of South Africa. Many were incarcerated alongside Nelson Mandela following the Rivonia Trial, and many became martyred fighting to end racial discrimination.

=== Mozambique ===
In the second half of the 1800s, many Gujarati Hindus belonging to the Vaniya community migrated to the South of Mozambique, in particular to the provinces of Inhambane and Lourenço Marques to run businesses. This was followed by migration of Hindus of various artisan castes from Diu to the region. Later in 1800s, immigration restrictions imposed by the colonial authorities in neighbouring South Africa and the Boer republic made Mozambique the preferred destination for many Gujarati Hindus from the Saurashtra (namely, Rajkot and Porbandar) and Surat regions.

The 1961 takeover of Portuguese Goa by India made life difficult for the Indian population in the then Portuguese colony of Mozambique. The independence of Mozambique like in other African countries led to many Gujaratis to move to Portugal.

=== Oman ===
Oman, holding a strategically important position at the mouth of the Persian Gulf, has been the primary focus of trade and commerce for medieval Gujarati merchants for much of its history and Gujaratis, along with various other ethnic groups, founded and settled its capital port city, Muscat. Some of the earliest Indian immigrants to settle in Oman were the Bhatias of Kutch, who have had a powerful presence in Oman dating back to the 16th century. At the turn of the 19th century, Gujaratis wielded enough clout that Faisal bin Turki, the great-grandfather of the current ruler, spoke Gujarati and Swahili along with his native Arabic and Oman's sultan Syed Said (1791-1856) was persuaded to shift his capital from Muscat to Zanzibar, more than two thousand miles from the Arabian mainland, on the recommendation of Shivji Topan and Bhimji families who lent money to the Sultan. In modern times, business tycoon Kanaksi Khimji, from the famous Khimji family of Gujarat was conferred title of Sheikh by the Sultan, the first ever use of the title for a member of the Hindu community. The Muscati Mahajan is one of the oldest merchants associations founded more than a century ago.

=== Southeast Asia ===
Gujaratis had a flourishing trade with Southeast Asia in the 15th and 16th centuries, and played a pivotal role in establishing Islam in the region. Miller (2010) presented a theory that the indigenous scripts of Sumatra (Indonesia), Sulawesi (Indonesia) and the Philippines are descended from an early form of the Gujarati script. Tomé Pires reported a presence of a thousand Gujaratis in Malacca (Malaysia) prior to 1512. The Gujarati language continues to be spoken in Singapore and Malaysia.

==== Hong Kong ====
Gujaratis also dominate the diamond trade in the city. As of 2012 350 diamond firms in Hong Kong were owned by Gujaratis.

==== Malaysia ====
There estimated around 31,500 Gujarati in Malaysia. Most of this community work as traders and settled in the urban parts of Malaysia like Melaka, George Town, Kuala Lumpur and Ipoh.

==== Fiji ====
Gujaratis in Fiji represent an important trading community within the large Indian population.

== Culture ==
=== Literature ===
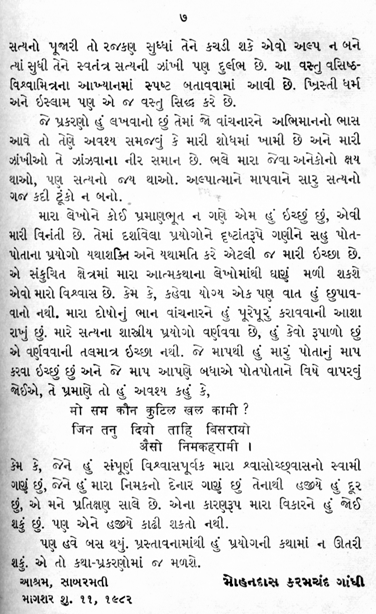
Excerpt from "My experiments with truth" - the autobiography of Mahatma Gandhi in its original Gujarati.

Kavi Kant, Kalapi and Abbas Abdulali Vasi are Gujarati language poets. Ardeshar Khabardar, Gujarati-speaking Parsi who was president of Gujarati Sahitya Parishad was a nationalist poet. His poem, Jya Jya Vase Ek Gujarati, Tya Tya Sadakal Gujarat (Wherever a Gujarati resides, there forever is Gujarat) depicts Gujarati ethnic pride and is widely popular in Gujarat.

Swaminarayan paramhanso, like Bramhanand, Premanand, contributed to Gujarati language literature with prose like Vachanamrut and poetry in the form of bhajans. Kanji Swami a spiritual mystic who was honoured with the title, 'Koh-i-Noor of Kathiawar' made literary contributions to Jain philosophy and promoted Ratnatraya.

Gujarati theatre owes a lot to bhavai. Bhavai is a musical performance of stage plays. Ketan Mehta and Sanjay Leela Bhansali explored artistic use of bhavai in films such as Bhavni Bhavai, Oh Darling! Yeh Hai India and Hum Dil De Chuke Sanam. Dayro (gathering) involves singing and conversation reflecting on human nature.

Gujarati language is enriched by the Adhyatmik literature written by the Jain scholar, Shrimad Rajchandra and Pandit Himmatlal Jethalal Shah. This literature is both in the form of poetry and prose.

=== Cuisine ===
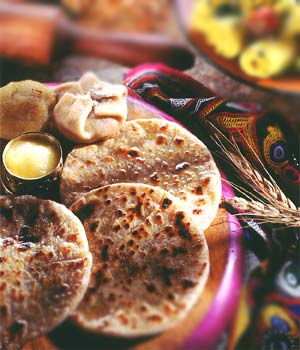
Vedhmi is a sweet lentil stuffed chapati.

Gujarati food has famously been described as "the haute cuisine of vegetarianism" and meals have a subtle balance of sweet, tart and mild hot sensations on the palate. Gujarati Jains, as well as many Hindus and Buddhists in Gujarat, are vegetarian. However, many Gujarati Hindu communities such as Ghanchi, Koli Patel, and Kharwa consume fish as part of their diet. Christians, and Muslims have traditionally eaten a variety of meats and seafood, although Muslims don't eat pork and Hindus don't eat beef. Gujarati cuisine follows the traditional Indian full meal structure of rice, cooked vegetables, lentil dal or curry and roti. The different types of flatbreads that a Gujarati cooks are rotli or chapati, bhakhri, puri, thepla, rotla, dhebara, maal purah, and puran-pohli. Popular snacks such as Khaman, Dhokla, Dhokli, dal-dhokli, Undhiyu, Jalebi, fafda, chevdoh, Muthia, Bhajia, Patra, bhusu, locho, sev usal, fafda gathiya, vanela gathiya and Sev mamra, Sev Khaman, Dabeli are traditional Gujarati dishes savoured by many communities across the world.

Khichdi — a mix of rice and mung dal, cooked with spice — is a popular and nutritious dish which has regional variations. Quite often the khichdi is accompanied by Kadhi. It is found satisfying by most Gujaratis, and cooked very regularly in most homes, typically on a busy day due to its ease of cooking. It can also become an elaborate meal such as a thali when served with several other side dishes such as a vegetable curry, yogurt, sabzi shaak, onions, mango pickle and papad.

Spices have traditionally been made on grinding stones, however, since villages have seen rapid growth and industrialisation in recent decades, today people may use a blender or grinder. People from north Gujarat use dry red chili powder, whereas people from south Gujarat prefer using green chili and coriander in their cooking. There is no standard recipe for Gujarati dishes, however the use of tomatoes and lemons is a consistent theme throughout Gujarat. Traditionally Gujaratis eat mukhwas at the end of a meal to enhance digestion, and desserts such as aam shrikhand made using mango salad and hung curd are very popular. In many parts of Gujarat, drinking chaas (chilled buttermilk) or soda after lunch or dinner is also quite common.

Surti delicacies include ghari which is a puri filled with khoa and nuts that is typically eaten during the festival Chandani Padva. Khambhat delicacies include famous sutarfeni — made from fine strands of sweet dough (rice or maida) garnished with pistachios, and halwasan which are hard squares made from broken wheat, khoa, nutmeg and pistachios. A version of English custard is made in Gujarat that uses cornstarch instead of the traditional eggs. It is cooked with cardamom and saffron, and served with fruit and sliced almonds. Gujarati families celebrate Sharad Purnima by having dinner with doodh-pauva under moonlight.

=== Folk dance and music ===
The folk dances of Gujarat are Garba, Dandiya, Padhar, Tippani, Dangi, etc. which are done during festivals.

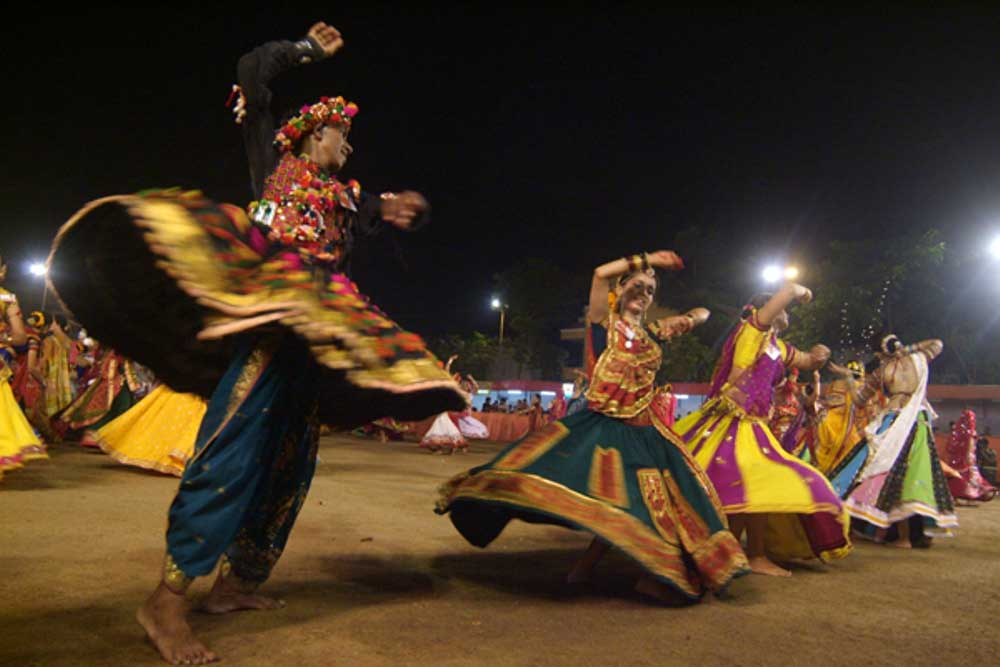
Women and men performing Garba as part of Navaratri celebrations in the city of Ahmedabad

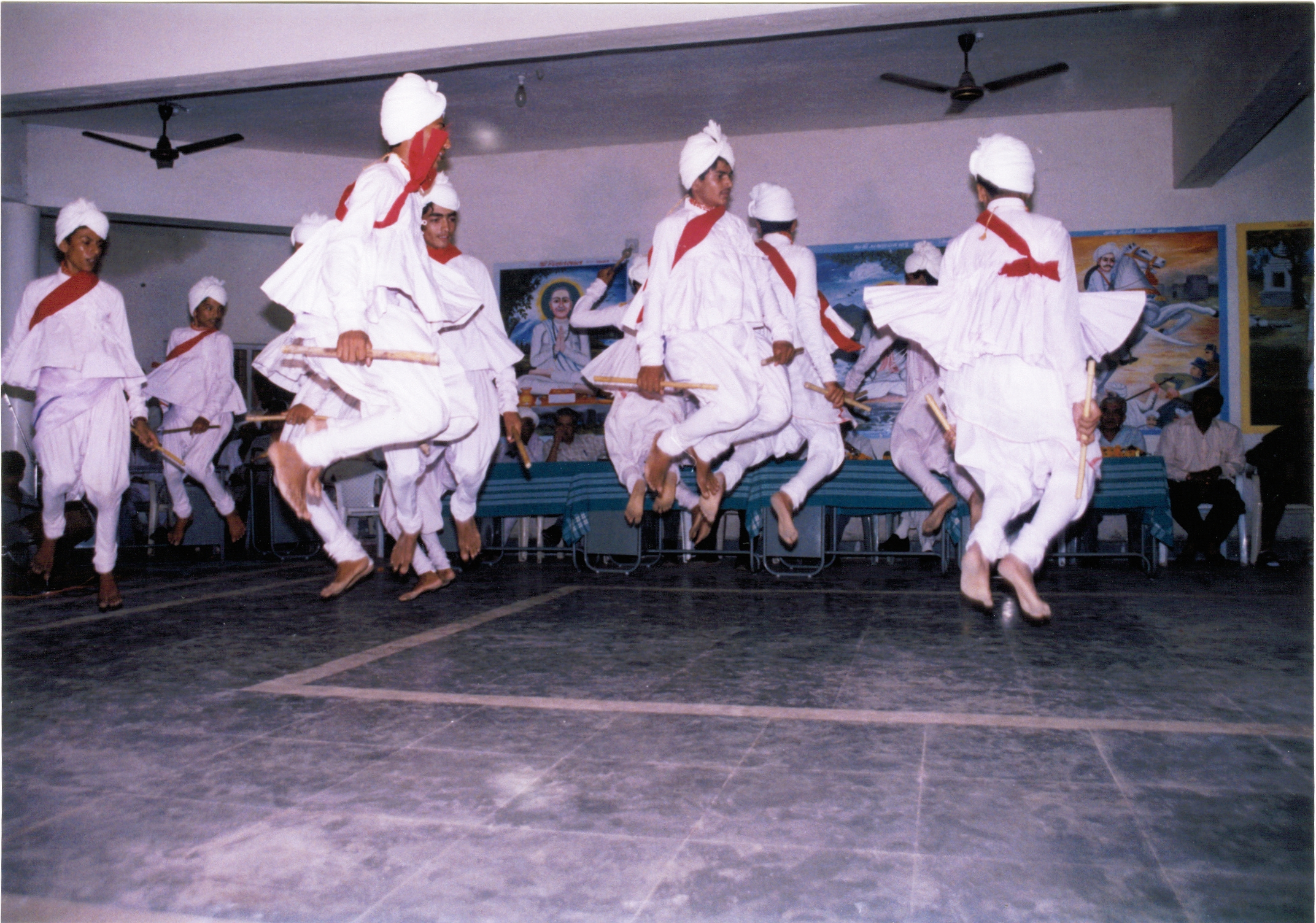
Mer Dandiya, a sword dance performed by the martial communities of Saurashtra

=== Gujarati folklore ===
Folklore is an important part of Gujarati culture. The folktales of Kankavati are religious in nature because they sprung from the ordinary day-to-day human cycle of life independent of, and sometimes deviating from the scriptures. They are part of the Hindu rituals and practices for marriage, baby shower, naming ceremony, the harvest and death, and are not merely religious acts but they reflect the lived life of people in rural and urban societies. The anthologies of Dadaji Ni Vato and Raang Chhe Barot are pragmatic with practical and the esoteric wisdom. Saurashtra Ni Rasdhar is a collection of love legends and depicts every shade of love and love is the main emotion which makes human world beautiful because it calls forth patience, responsibility, sense of commitment and dedication. Also the study of Meghani's works is quintessential because he was a trailblazer in exploring the vast unexplored heritage of Gujarati folklore. His folktales mirror the milieu of Gujarat, dialects, duhas, decors, humane values, sense of sacrifice and spirit of adventure, enthusiasm and, of course, the flaws in people. Meghani's folktales are verbal miniature of Gujarati culture.

== Images ==
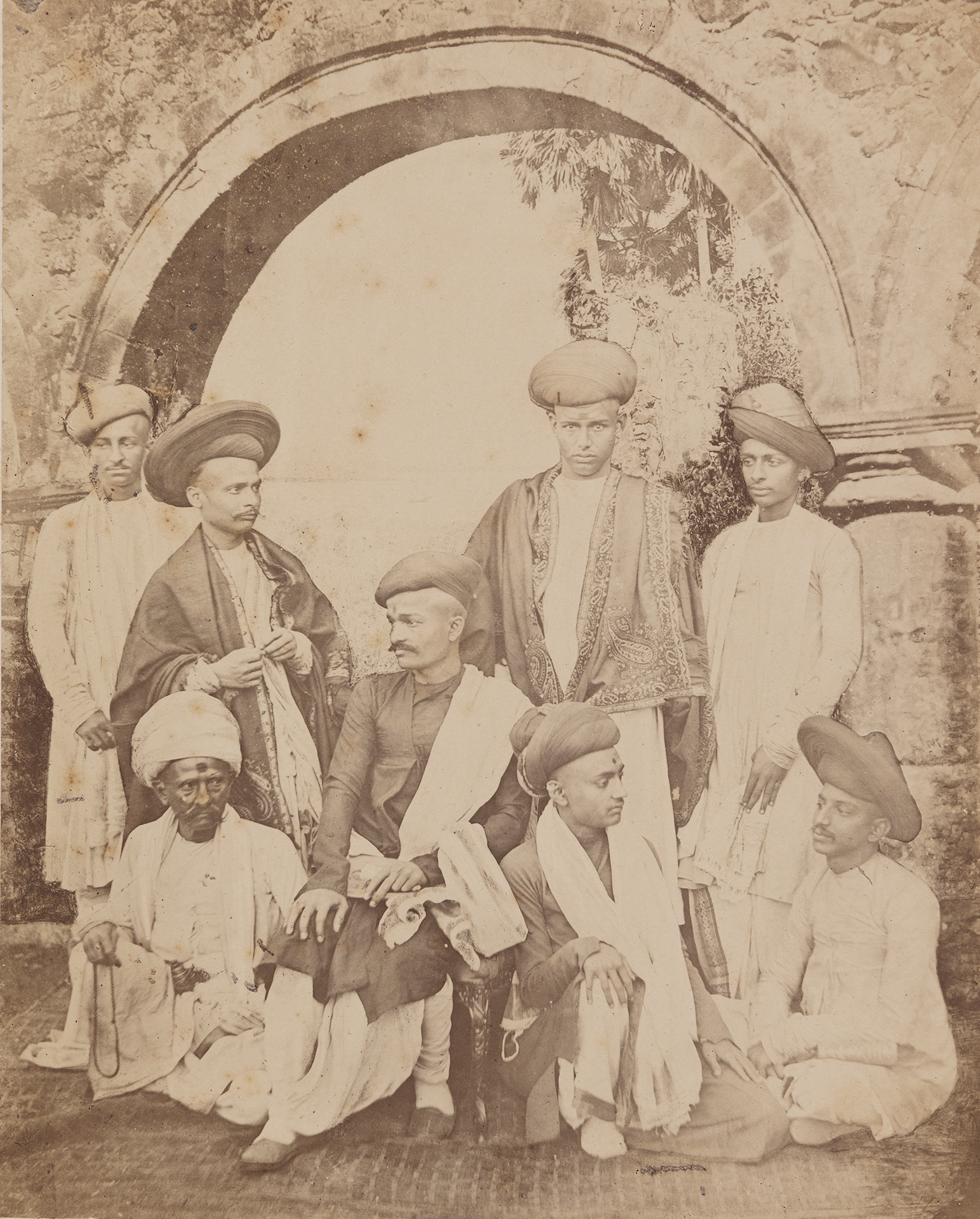
Nagar Brahmins in western India (c. 1855–1862)

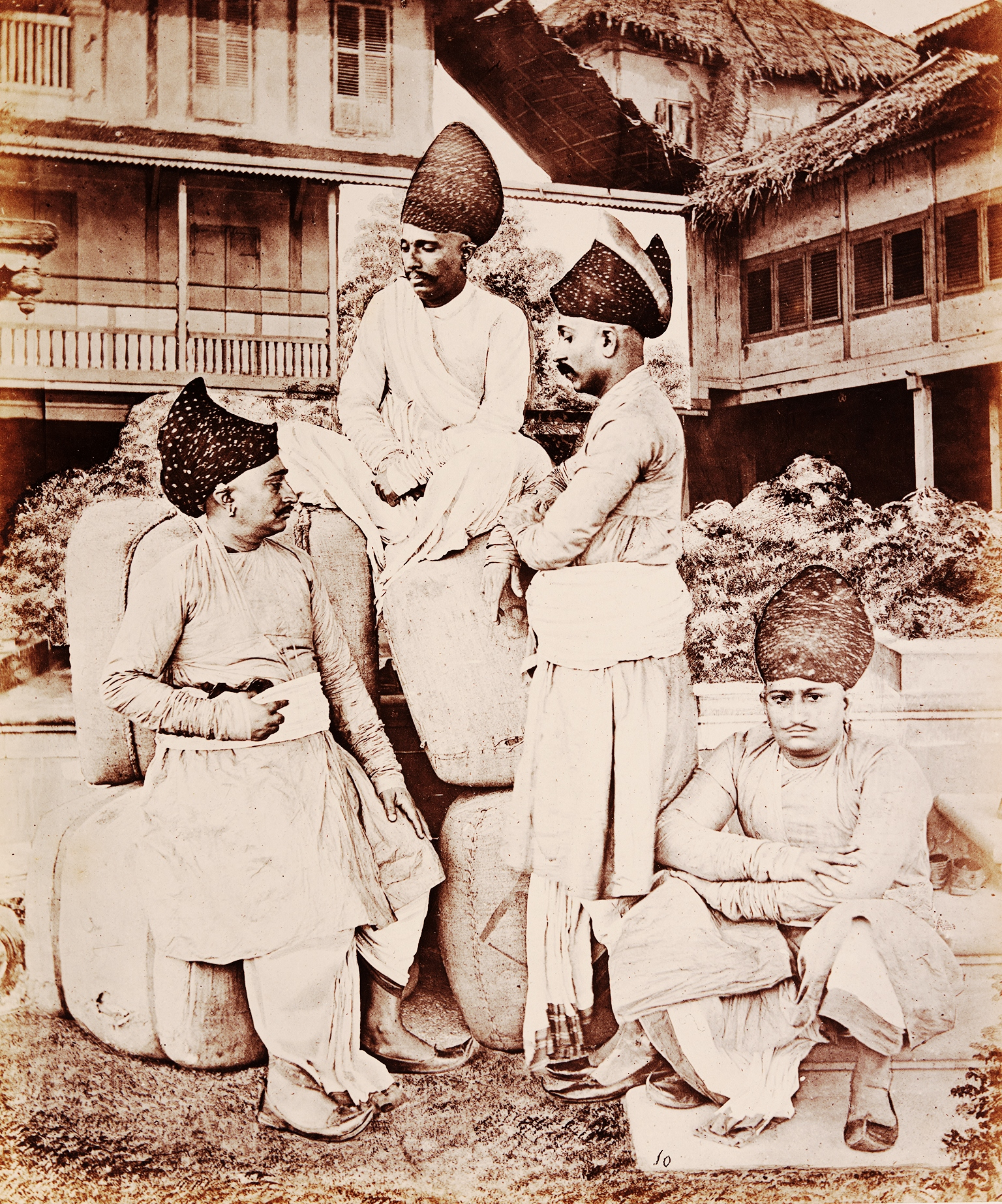
Bhatias in western India (c. 1855–1862)

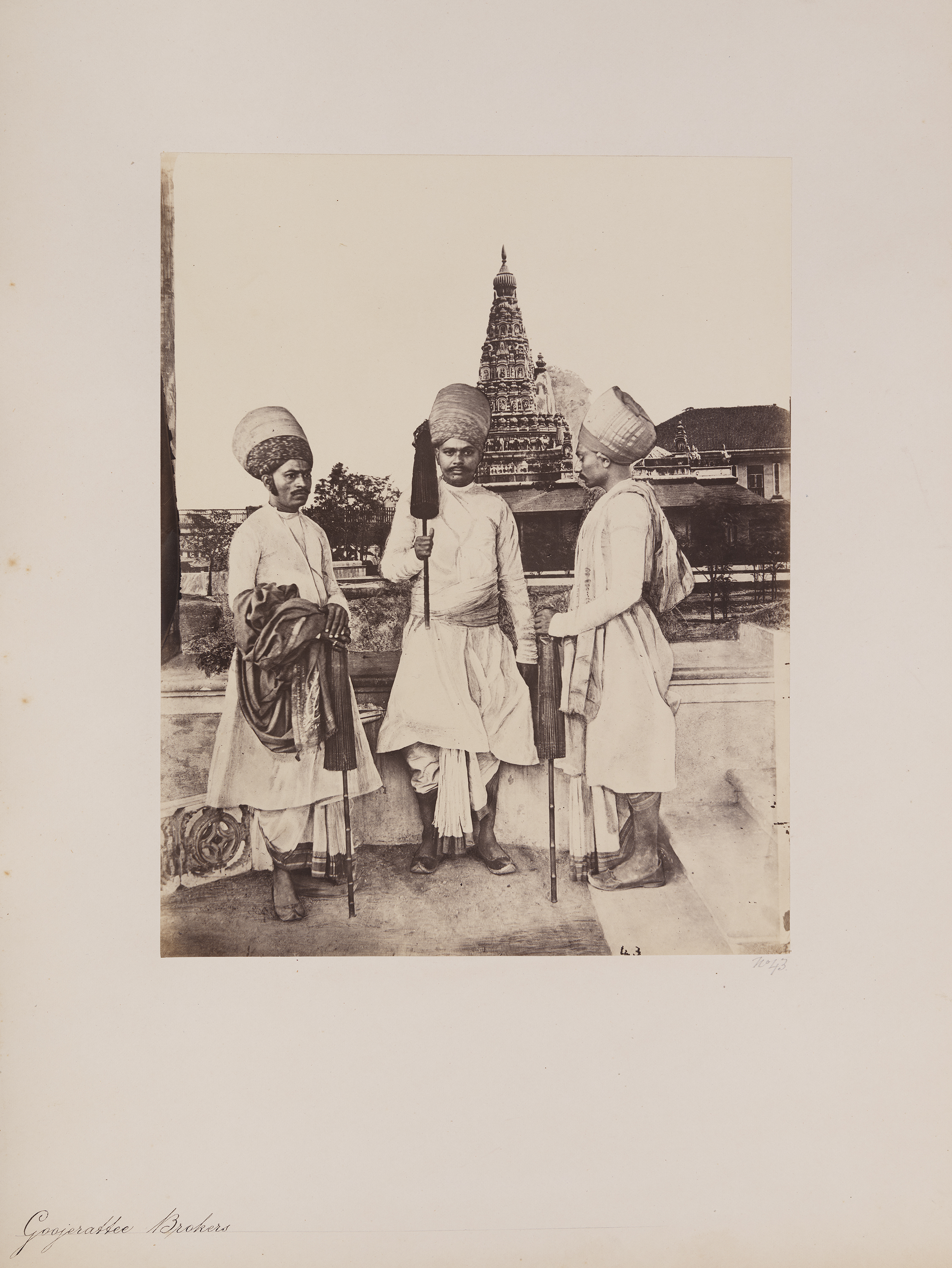
Gujarati brokers in western India (c. 1855–1862)

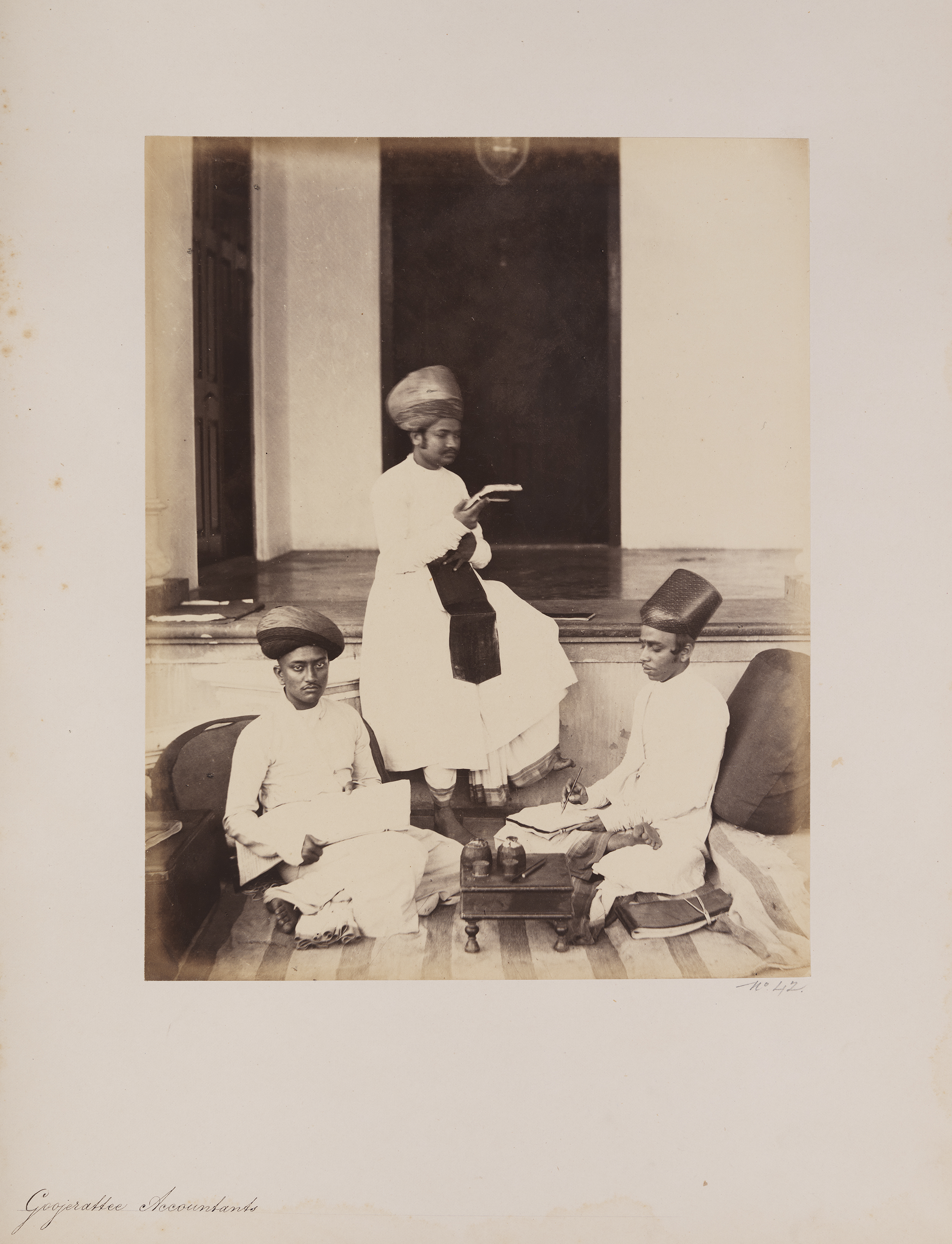
Gujarati accountants in western India (c. 1855–1862)

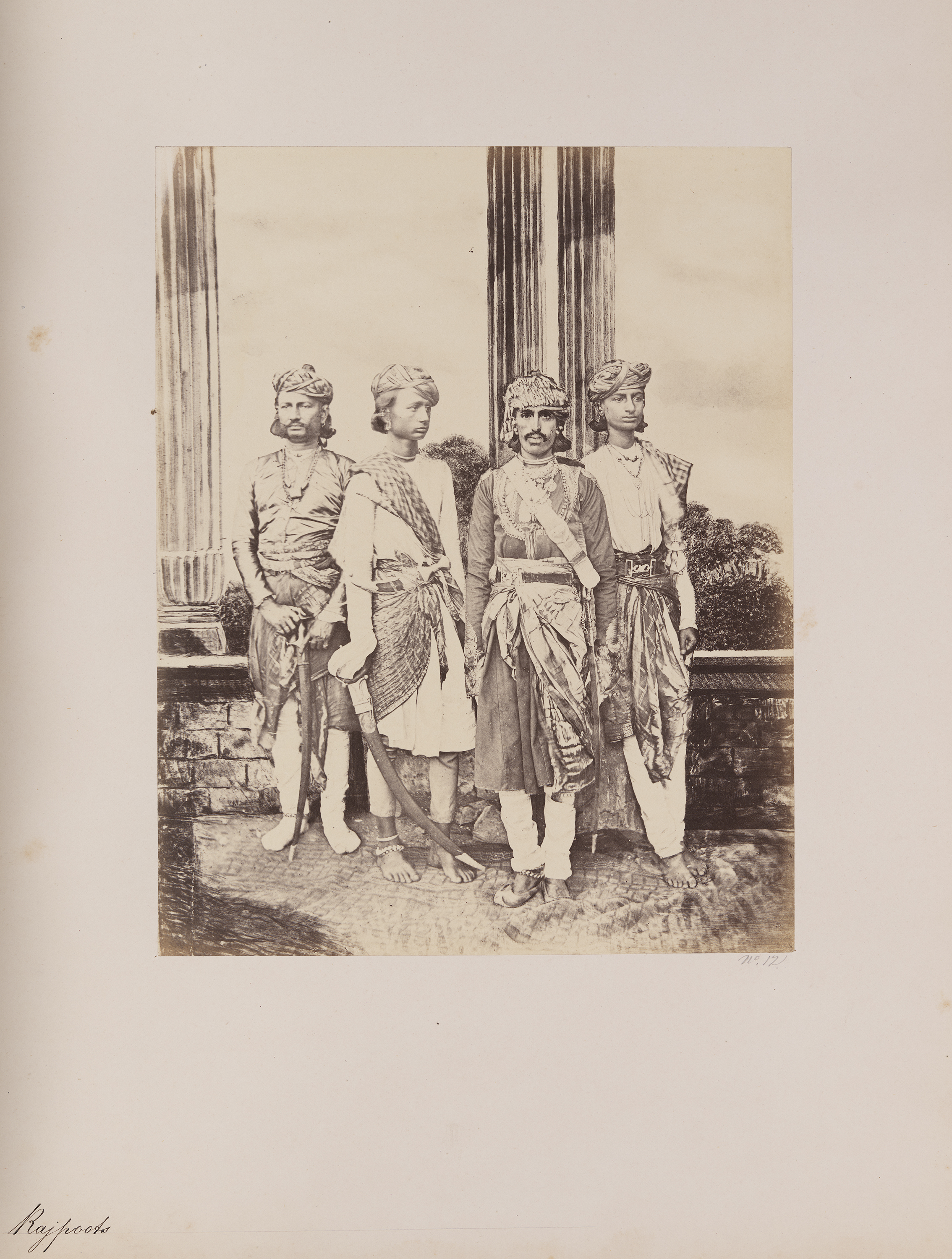
Rajputs in western India (c. 1855–1862)

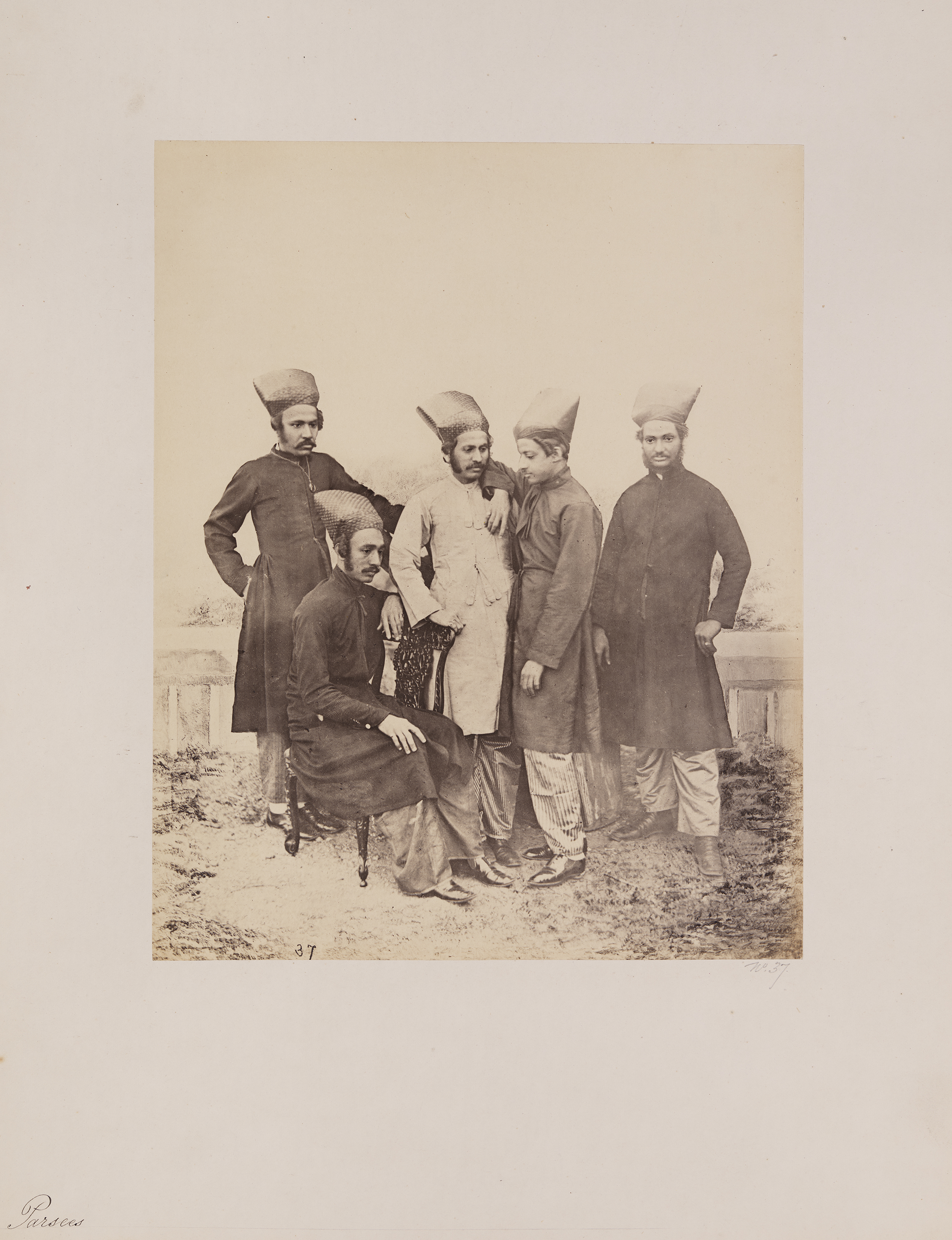
Parsis in western India (c. 1855–1862)

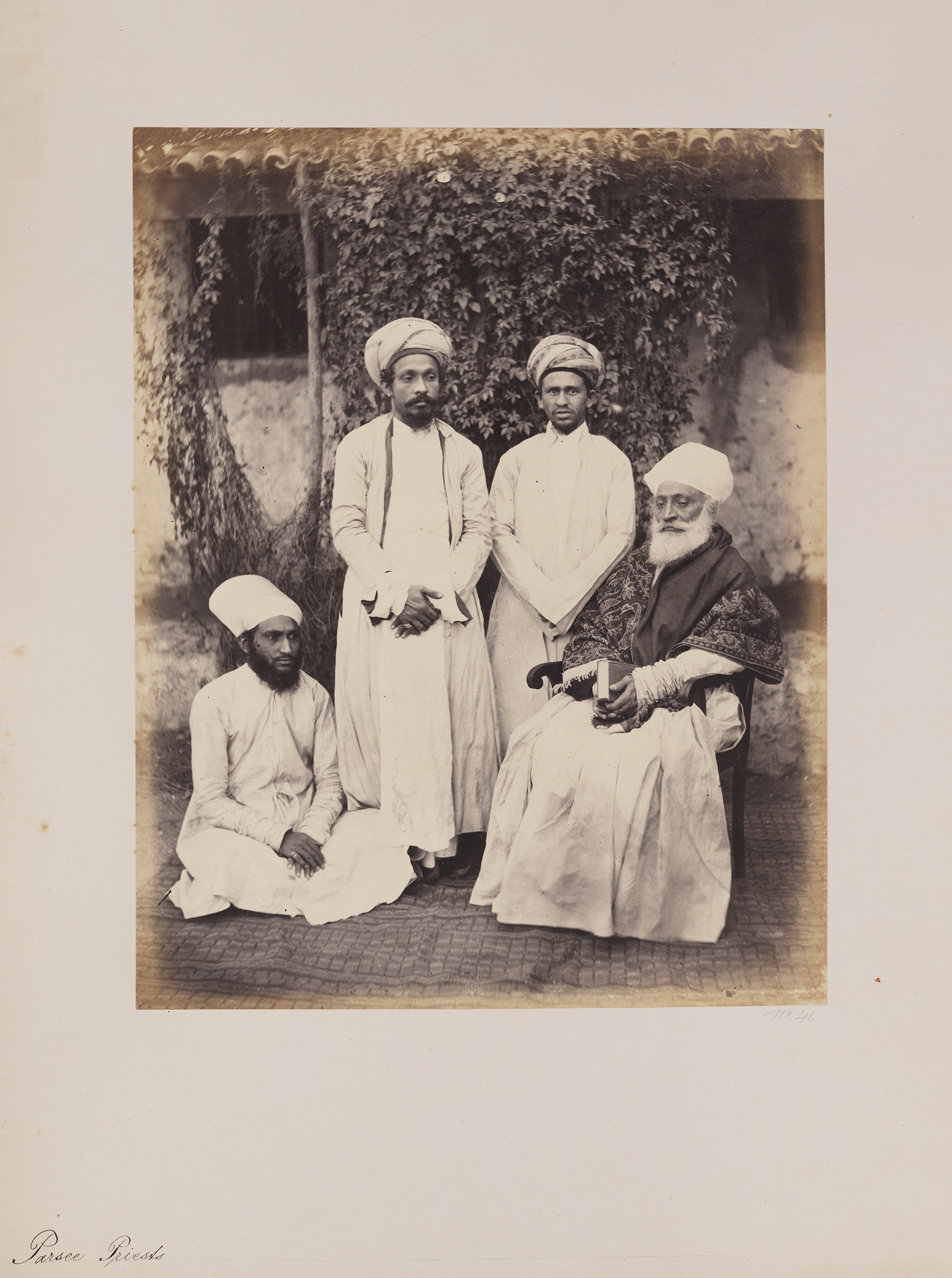
Parsi priests in western India (c. 1855–1862)

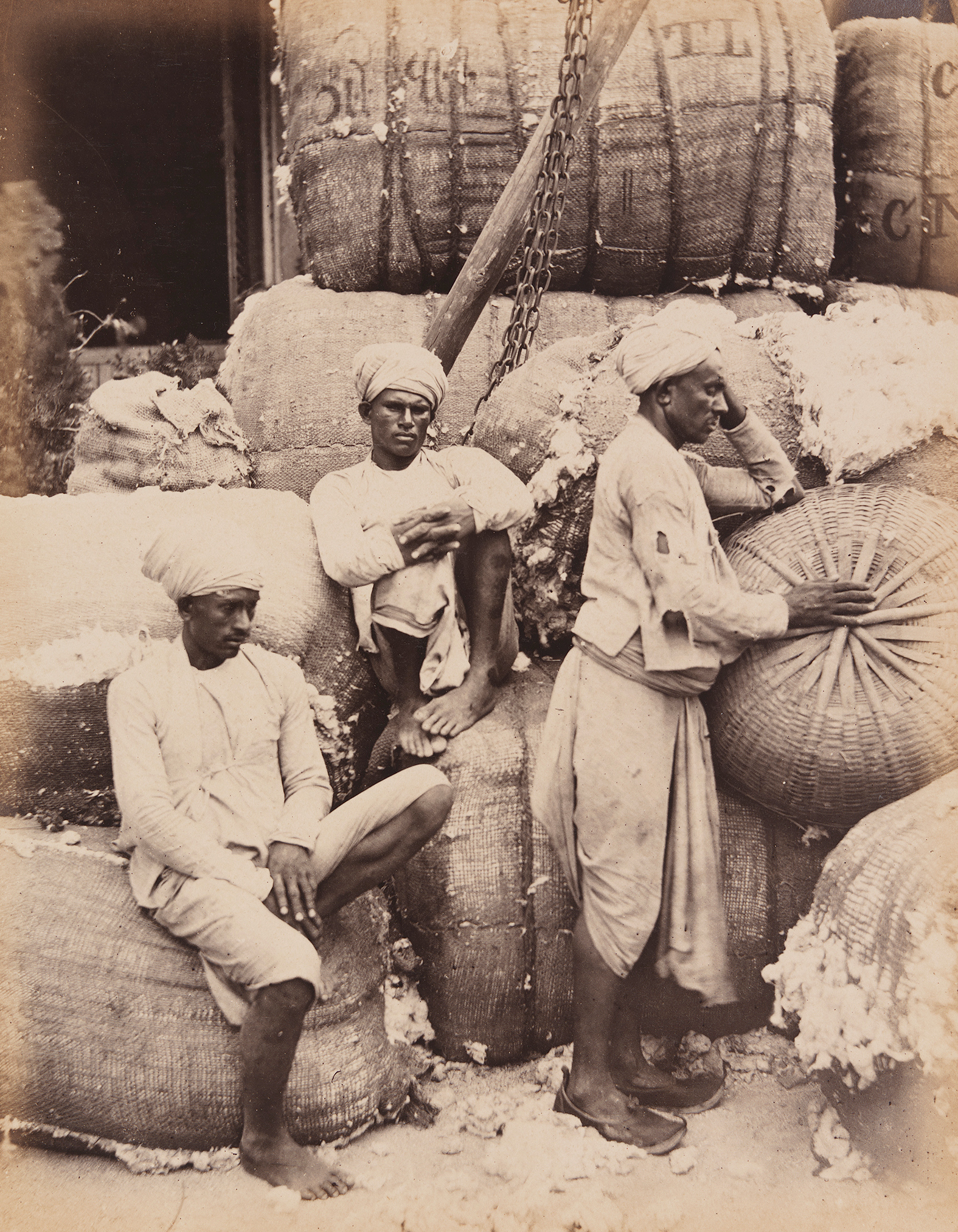
Lohanas in western India (c. 1855–1862)

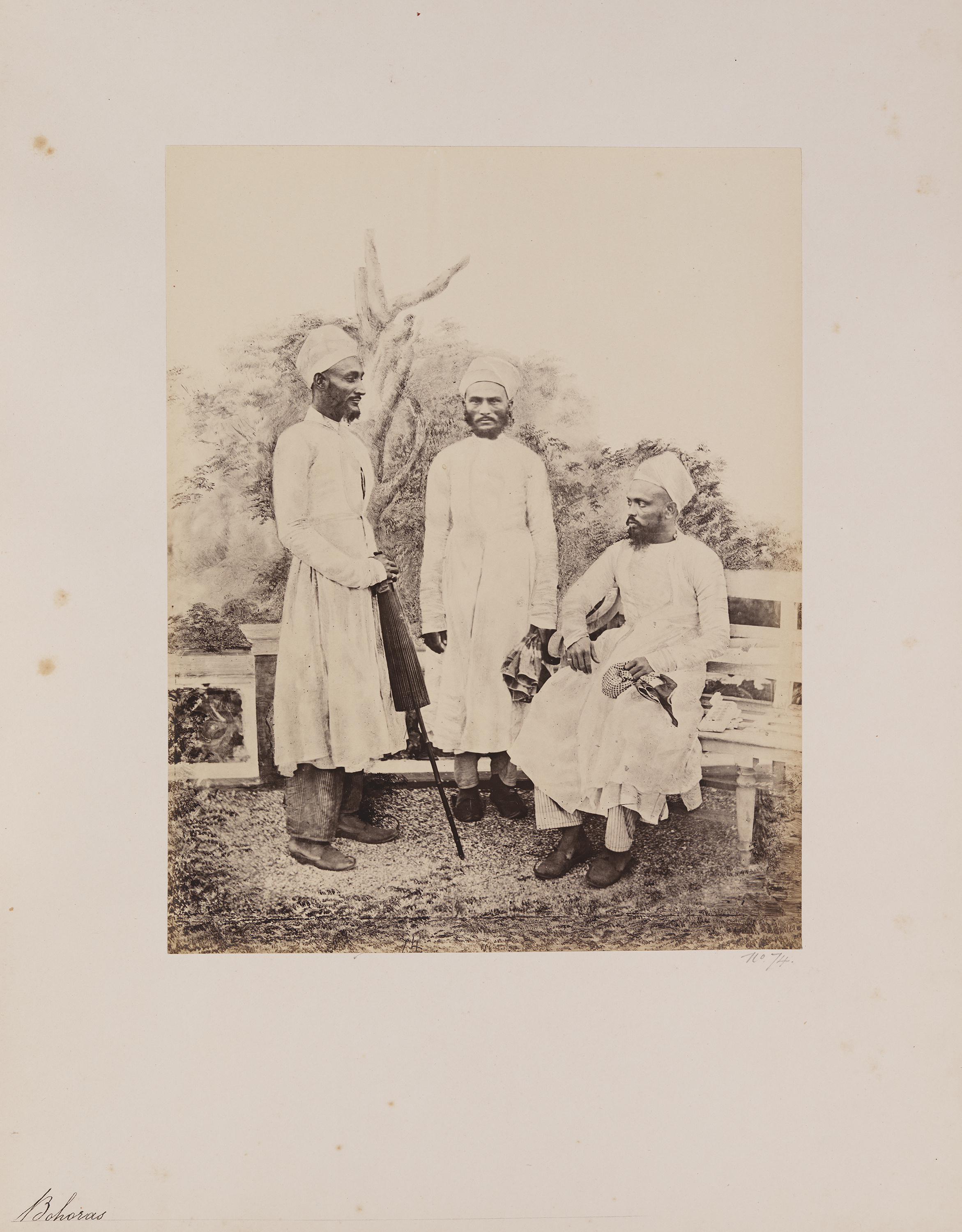
Bohras in western India (c. 1855–1862)

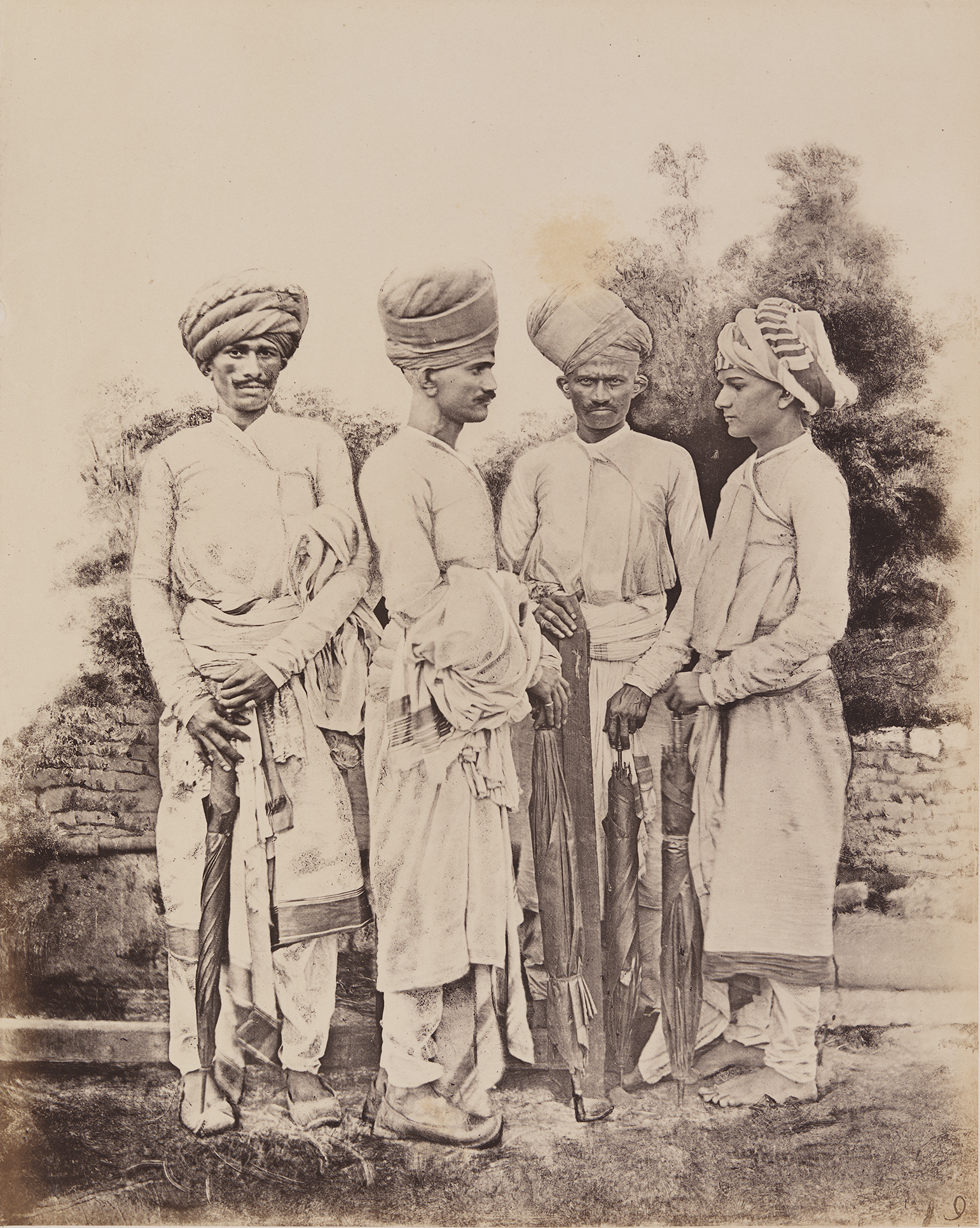
Banians of Damnaggar (Kutch)

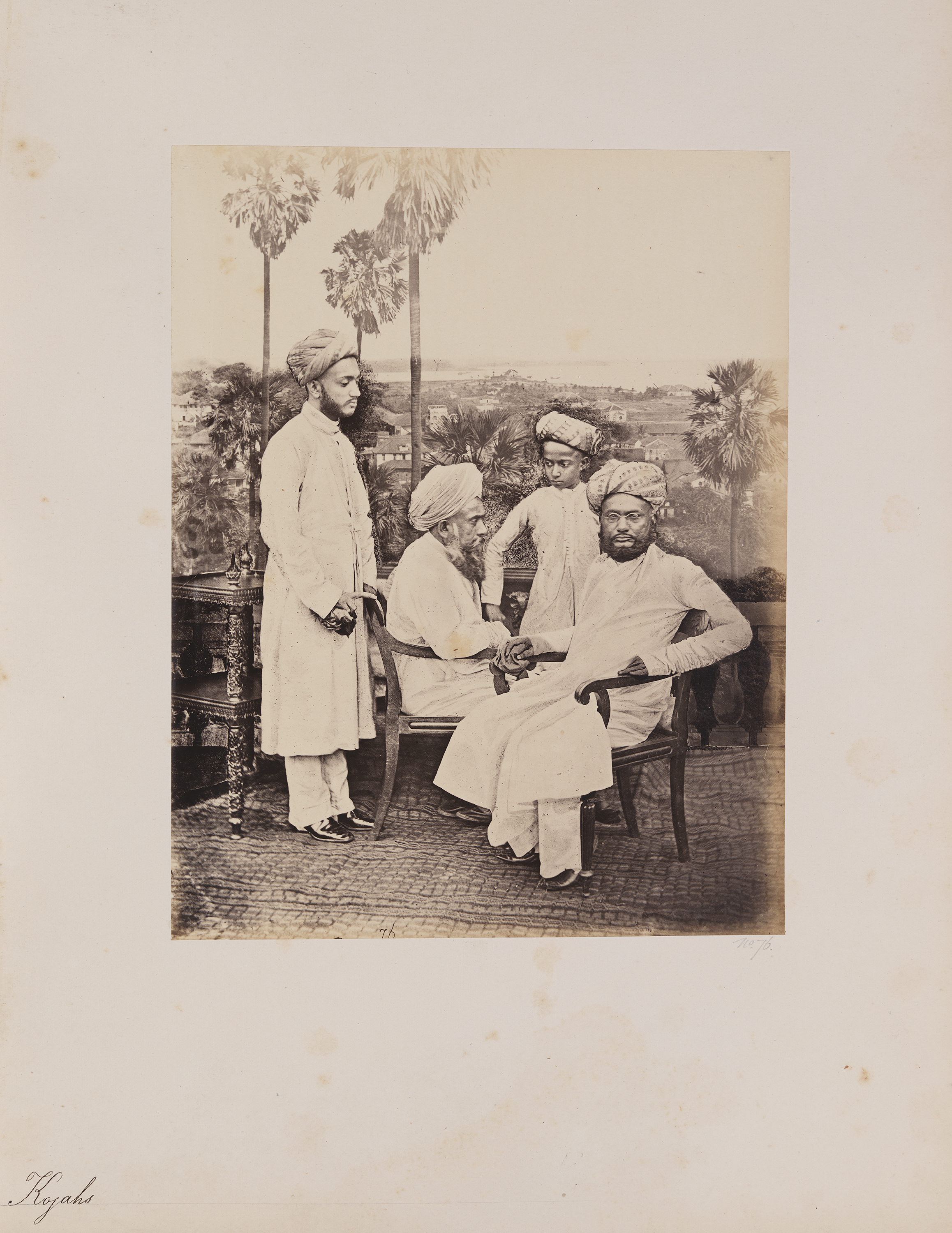
Khojas of Western India ca. 1855-1862

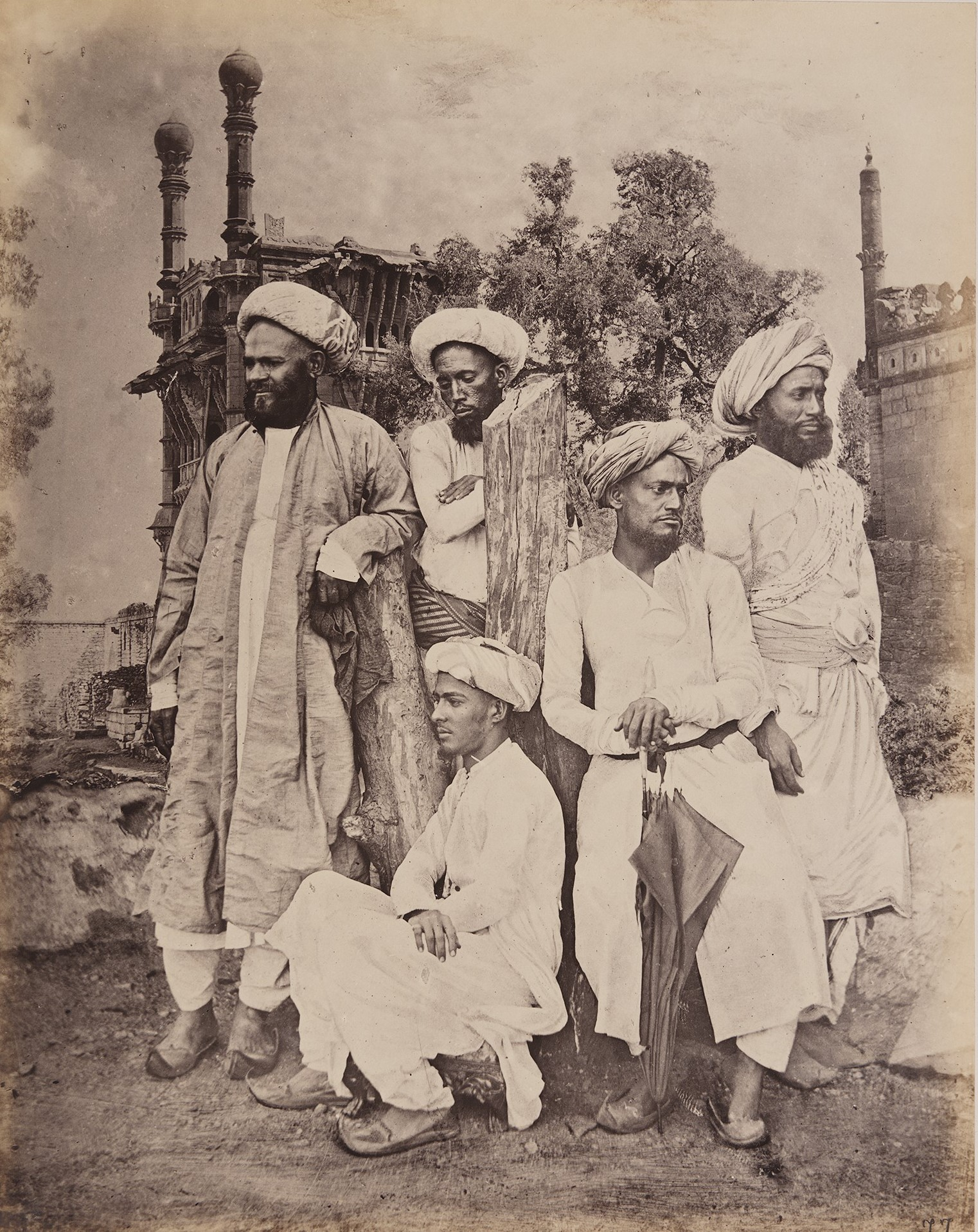
Memon men - photographs of Western India Series 1855-1862

== See also ==
- List of people from Gujarat
- Gujarati diaspora
- Jethwa Rajputs
- Rajputs of Gujarat
- Dharasana Satyagraha
- Navnirman Andolan
- Mahagujarat Movement
- Hind Swaraj or Indian Home Rule
- Genetic studies on Gujarati people
- Khatiawari Memons
