= Gujarati diaspora =

Ethnic Gujaratis and their descendants living outside of India and Pakistan

Regions with significant populations
- United States, Britain, Canada, East Africa, Caribbean, Fiji

Languages
- Gujarati, English (Indian dialect or Pakistani dialect), Memon

Religion
- Majority: Hinduism; Minority: Islam; Jainism; Zoroastrianism

The Gujarati diaspora refers to the descendants of the Indian ethnolinguistic group known as Gujaratis who emigrated out of Gujarat and adjacent areas in the Indian subcontinent to the rest of the world.

Gujaratis have a long tradition of seafaring and a history of overseas migration to foreign lands, to Yemen Oman Bahrain, Kuwait, Zanzibar and other countries in the Persian Gulf since a mercantile culture resulted naturally from the state's proximity to the Arabian Sea. The countries with the largest Gujarati populations are Pakistan, United Kingdom, United States, Canada, the Caribbean, Fiji and many countries in Southern and East Africa. Globally, Gujaratis are estimated to constitute around 33% of the Indian diaspora worldwide and can be found in 129 of 190 countries listed as sovereign nations by the United Nations. Non Resident Gujaratis (NRGs) maintain active links with the homeland in the form of business, remittance, philanthropy, and through their political contribution to state governed domestic affairs.

Gujaratis in the diaspora are prominent entrepreneurs and industrialists and maintain high social capital. Gujarati parents in the diaspora are not comfortable with the possibility of their language not surviving them. In a study, 80% of Malayali parents felt that "children would be better off with English", compared to 36% of Kannada parents and only 19% of Gujarati parents.

== Notable people ==
Kash Patel Director of the Federal Bureau of Investigation (FBI)

- Aliza Vellani, born in Vancouver, Canada, Canadian actress
- Arun Manilal Gandhi, born in Durban, American activist and author
- Ben Kingsley, born in Snainton, British actor
- Bharat Desai, born in Kenya, American businessman and billionaire
- Charli XCX, born in Cambridge, British singer and songwriter
- Dev Patel, born in Harrow, British actor
- Freddie Mercury, born in Zanzibar, British singer, lead vocalist of Queen
- Kantilal Jivan Shah, Seychellois conservationist
- Kal Penn , American actor, author & Former Civil Servant
- Kash Patel, born in Garden City, American lawyer, politician, and Director of the Federal Bureau of Investigation (FBI)
- Khursheed Jeejeebhoy, born in Rangoon, Canadian gastroenterologist
- Mahmood Mamdani, born in Bombay, Ugandan academic
- Naheed Nenshi, born in Toronto, Canadian politician and former mayor
- Nimisha Mehta, born in Ahmedabad, British actress and model
- Raj Bhavsar, born in Houston, American Olympic gymnast
- Rizwan Manji, born in Toronto, Canadian actor
- Salim Kara, born in Zanzibar, Canadian inventor and entrepreneur
- Shabir Ally, born in Guyana, Canadian Islamic preacher
- Shekhar Mehta, born in Uganda, Kenyan rally driver
- Baroness Shriti Vadera, born in Uganda, British businesswoman and politician
- Zohran Mamdani, born in Kampala, American politician and mayor of New York City
- Avani Gregg, American social media personality
- Swayam Bhatia, American actress

== See also ==
- Gujarati people
- Gujarati language
- Indian diaspora
