= ShipWorks =

Auctane shipping software

- Type: Subsidiary
- Industry: E-commerce
- Founded: 2000; 26 years ago
- Headquarters: St. Louis
- Products: Software
- Services: eCommerce Shipping; Printing Shipping Labels
- Parent: Auctane

ShipWorks is a product under the Auctane family of shipping software, and is a subsidiary of Auctane. It is a multi-carrier shipping software, for warehouses and e-commerce merchants that ship high volumes of packages, and integrates online sales and marketplace systems including eBay, Etsy, PayPal, Amazon, and Yahoo. The software provides direct support for many US based carriers including UPS, FedEx, USPS, Stamps.com, Endicia, DHL Global Mail, Express 1, OnTrac, uShip and i-Parcel.

ShipWorks was founded in 2000 by Wes Clayton, Co-CEO and COO, and Brian Nottingham, Co-CEO and CTO.

The company's headquarters are located at the top floor of the Gateway Tower in downtown Saint Louis with a view on the Gateway Arch and the Busch Stadium, home of the St. Louis Cardinals Major League Baseball team. They also have employees at the Auctane headquarters office in Austin, TX.

Stamps.com acquired the company on October 20, 2014 for $22 million
