= Kantilal =

Kantilal is an Indian name and it may refer to

- Kantilal Amrutiya, Indian politician
- Kantilal Bhuria, Indian politician
- Kantilal Ghia, Indian politician
- Kantilal Hastimal Sancheti, Orthopaedic physician
- Kantilal Jivan, Guru
- Kantilal Kanjee, Zimbabwean cricketer
- Kantilal Mardia, Indian statistician
- Kantilal Ranchhodji Desai, Indian cricketer
- Kantilal Thakoredas Desai, former Chief Justice of the High Court of Gujarat
