= Chandani Padva =

Observance in Gujarat, India

Chandani Padva or Chandi Padvo is an occasion when Surtis (Gujarati people from Surat) enjoy a popular local variety of sweet Ghari, Bhushu (namkin). The festival falls on a day after Sharad Poornima, the last full moon day in the Hindu calendar. People generally gather on the terrace with friends and family and enjoy delicious Gari and Bhushu.
