= Karadiya Rajput =

Rajput caste of Gujarat

Karadiya Rajput (sometimes spelled Karadia) is an Indian Hindu caste of the Rajput community.

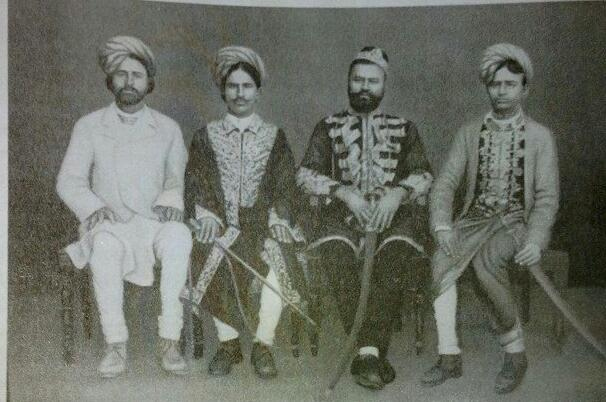
Karadiya Rajputs of Wadhwan

== Origin ==
While having their origins in the regions of Malwa, Ujjain and Rajasthan, they are primarily found in the Saurashtra, Kutch and other region of Gujarat, India.

== Culture ==
One of their primary deities is Shiva. The majority of the community is vegetarian; and inter-caste/class marriages are not encouraged. One of their traditional folk dances is the Hinch, also called the Gaagar Nritya.

Jhala's 2010 review of studies on the community noted

Mori in 1999 studied on Karadia Rajput Gyatima Samajik Parivartan,[.] He found that the men wore chorno as a lower garment and kediyu as an upper garment. When they went out they wore a twisted turban. The turban differed from place to place. Men wore pachedi on the shoulder. On the feet they wore flowered studded shoes. The ladies wore red or black thepada which was unstitched, on the top they wore kapdu which was plain both sides and the chest portion was of red, black or green kinkhab fabric. The sleeves were of different colour with a red border. The middle class ladies wore colourful cotton cloths. They also wore odhani on the head. The young girls wore ghaghra, blouse and odhani. The elderly women wore baloya on the wrist and all the women were tattooed on their hands.

== Classification ==
Karadiya rajput currently classified as Socially and Educationally Backward Classes (SEBC). Karadiya caste Serial No. 102 was included in SEBC list as per Government Resolution No. SSP/ 1194/ 1411/ A Dated 25/7/1994. Karadiya Rajput are listed in Central List of OBCs for the State of Gujarat.

== See also ==
- Garasia
- Nadoda Rajput
- Molesalam Rajput
