= Nadoda Rajput =

Rajput community in Gujarat, India

Nadoda are a Rajput community found in the state of Gujarat, India.They are notable for their historic refusal to pay taxes to the sultans.

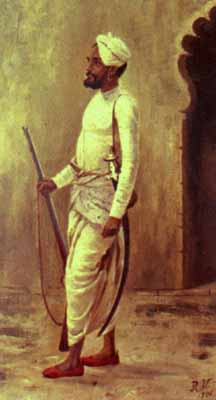

== Origin ==
While having their origins in the regions of Malwa and Rajasthan, they are primarily found in the Saurashtra, Kutch, Patan and other region of Gujarat, India.

== History ==
Nadoda Rajputs are one of the Rajput communities of Gujarat, they migrated from Rajasthan about six hundred years ago. The belief is that the Nadoda refuse to pay taxes to the Muslim rulers. Hence, they were called Naravaya (defaulters) and Nadoda is its corrupt form. The term "Nadoda" dates back to the Muslim invasion of India. As regards the explanations of the word nadoda, it is to be derived from Nadavata, transferred to the ——a declension in Prakrit. Thus Nadava give rise to word Nadoda.

== Culture ==
Nadoda Rajputs are Kshatriya by varna. They are followers of their Kuldevi. Lord Shiva and Krishna are their primary deities.

Nadoda Rajputs have four ghols (marriage circles) and marital alliances between them is restricted. In case of dress, ornaments, customs, social practices and style of life each ghol is specific in relation to others. They are aligned to Rajputs-Darbar groups, They are one of the members of ther-tasili.

== Clans ==
Nadoda Rajputs further have ataks (clans) which enjoy an equal social status. These clans (ataks: Surnames) are Avera,Barad, Bhati, Chavda, Chavad, Chudasama, Chohan, Dabhi, Dayma (Dahima), Dod, Dodiya, Galecha, Gohil, Goletar, Hadial, Herma, Jadav, Jiriya, Jethva, Kuchhotia, Kher, Lakum, Makvana (Makwana), Mori, Masani, Narvan, Pavra, Padhar, Padhiar, Palonia, Parmar, Rathod, Rehevar, Rathavi, Solanki, Sindhav(Sindhav), Suvar(Sur), Tank, Tuar(Tunvar), Vadhel, Vaghela, Vaish(Vainsh), Vaja, Vala, Vanol, Vejol(Vihol). They are Kshatriya through Akhil Bharatiya Kshatriya Mahasabha.

== See also ==
- Chavda dynasty
- Rajputs of Gujarat
- Jadeja
- Garasia
- Molesalam Rajput
