= Vala (clan) =

Rajput clan found in Gujarat, India

Vala વાળા
- Gotra in Kolis, Rajputs and Kathis
- Ethnicity: Kolis; Rajputs; Kathis
- Location: Gujarat; Daman and Diu
- Varna: Kshatriya
- Demonym: Gujarati people
- Language: Gujarati; Koli; Hindi; English
- Religion: Hindu

The Vala, or Wala is a Gujarati clan (Gotra) mostly found among the Koli, Rajput and Kathi castes of Gujarat.
