= Stamps.com =

American services company

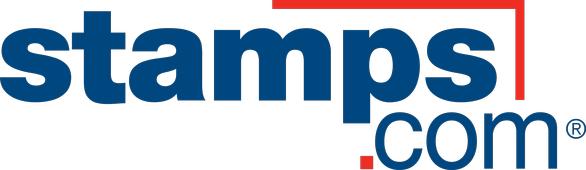
- Product type: Internet postage, Custom postage stamps, Shipping software
- Current owner: Auctane
- Introduced: 1996; 30 years ago
- Website: stamps.com

Auctane
- Type: Private
- Industry: Business Services
- Founded: 1996; 30 years ago (as Stamps.com)
- Headquarters: Austin, Texas, U.S.
- Key people: Jim McDermott; (Stamps.com Founder); Jeff Green; (Stamps.com Founder); Ari Engelberg; (Stamps.com Founder); Albert Ko; (CEO); Amit Deodhar; (CFO)
- Products: Internet postage, Custom postage stamps, Shipping software
- Revenue: ▲US$757.98 million (Stamps.com 2020)
- Operating income: ▲US$198.152 million (Stamps.com 2020)
- Net income: ▲US$178.665 million (Stamps.com 2020)
- Total assets: ▲US$1.297 billion (Stamps.com 2020)
- Total equity: ▲US$974.119 million (Stamps.com 2020)
- Owner: Thoma Bravo
- Number of employees: 1,100
- Subsidiaries: ShipStation; Stamps.com; Packlink; ShipEngine; Metapack; ShippingEasy; Endicia; ShipWorks; GlobalPost; Shipsi
- Website: auctane.com

Stamps.com is a brand and the former corporate name of Auctane, an American company that provides Internet-based mailing and shipping services. Until its acquisition by Thoma Bravo, Stamps.com was a public company traded on the NASDAQ exchange under the symbol STMP. The company's main offices are located in Austin, Texas. Historically when Stamps.com was a stand alone public company it was founded and based in Los Angeles until after the merger with Thoma Bravo.

== History ==
Founded in 1996, Stamps.com was created under the name StampMaster by Jim McDermott, Ari Engelberg, and Jeff Green, who at the time were MBA graduate students at UCLA. StampMaster was among the first companies to obtain approval from the United States Postal Service for beta testing and introducing Internet postage to the market. The Postal Service began announcing proposals for digital delivery of postage in 1996.

Stamps.com finished its Series A funding in February 1998 with $1.5 million. Series B funding followed in August 1998 with $4.52 million. It had its last round of private financing in February 1999, generating an additional $30 million from investors including former Postmaster General, Marvin Runyon. The company went public in June of the same year and raised $55 million in its IPO. Less than six months after its IPO, the company had its secondary public offering. In August 1999, the Postal Service granted permission for Stamps.com to sell its service nationally. Stamps.com purchased IShip.com, a company that compared prices of shipping services, for $305 million in stock or eight million shares, in October 1999.

In 2001, Stamps.com named Ken McBride its CEO. The U.S. Postal Service authorized the first market test of PhotoStamps in 2004. In 2005, the company reported $10.4 million in net income. PhotoStamps was re-launched in May 2005 for another year-long test run. The United States Congress amended a law in January 2006 that had prohibited attaching business advertising to postage, effective in May of that year, which cleared the way for businesses to use PhotoStamps. In September 2006, the company launched Photo NetStamps, which combined its previous NetStamps product with PhotoStamps. This combination allowed PhotoStamps to be used with exact postage printed from Stamps.com software. By 2008, Stamps.com had more than 300,000 customers. The company recorded revenues of $38.6 million in 2012.

By 2013, it had approximately 465,000 registered customers. Stamps.com reported $147.3 million in revenue the following year. It acquired Auctane ShipStation, a web-based multi-carrier shipping vendor based in Austin, Texas, in June 2014 for $50 million and up to 768,900 shares of stock. Auctane LLC, which used the trade name ShipStation, was founded in 2011 and creates tools to import orders from shopping cart platforms for order fulfillment. The acquisition made Auctane an independent subsidiary of Stamps.com operated by its existing management team. In October that same year, Stamps.com acquired ShipWorks, a multi-carrier shipping software company that integrates with shopping cart platforms, for $22 million. ShipWorks continued to operate as an independent, wholly owned subsidiary of Auctane.

In March 2015, Stamps.com entered into an agreement to acquire Endicia, another internet postage company, from Newell Rubbermaid for approximately $215 million. Endicia's products include the DYMO Stamps and PictureItPostage brands.

On June 20, 2016, Stamps.com announced that it had entered into a definitive agreement to purchase ShippingEasy, Inc., an Austin, Texas-based company which offers web-based multi-carrier shipping software that allows online retailers and e-commerce merchants to organize, process, fulfill and ship their orders. Stamps.com agreed to acquire ShippingEasy for $55 million in cash, as well as performance-linked equity awards of 87,000 shares of Stamps.com's common stock.

On July 25, 2018, Stamps.com announced another agreement to purchase Metapack Ltd., a London-based company providing delivery management technology to e-commerce retailers and brands. The agreement was made on the price of approx. £175 million in cash. MetaPack continued to operate as a wholly owned subsidiary led by its current management.

On July 9, 2021, Thoma Bravo announced a pending acquisition of Stamps.com at a $330/share price, and a 40-day "go-shop" period for alternative proposals. The acquisition was completed in October of that year, and in December the company changed its corporate name to Auctane, previously the name of its subsidiary that owned ShipStation, ShippingEasy, ShipEngine, and ShipWorks. Thoma Bravo announced that it would merge Auctane and WWEX Group, a third-party logistics company, after acquiring the latter in March 2026. According to WWEX, the merger would create "the most comprehensive, AI-enabled end-to-end logistics platform in the market".

== Products ==
=== Online postage ===
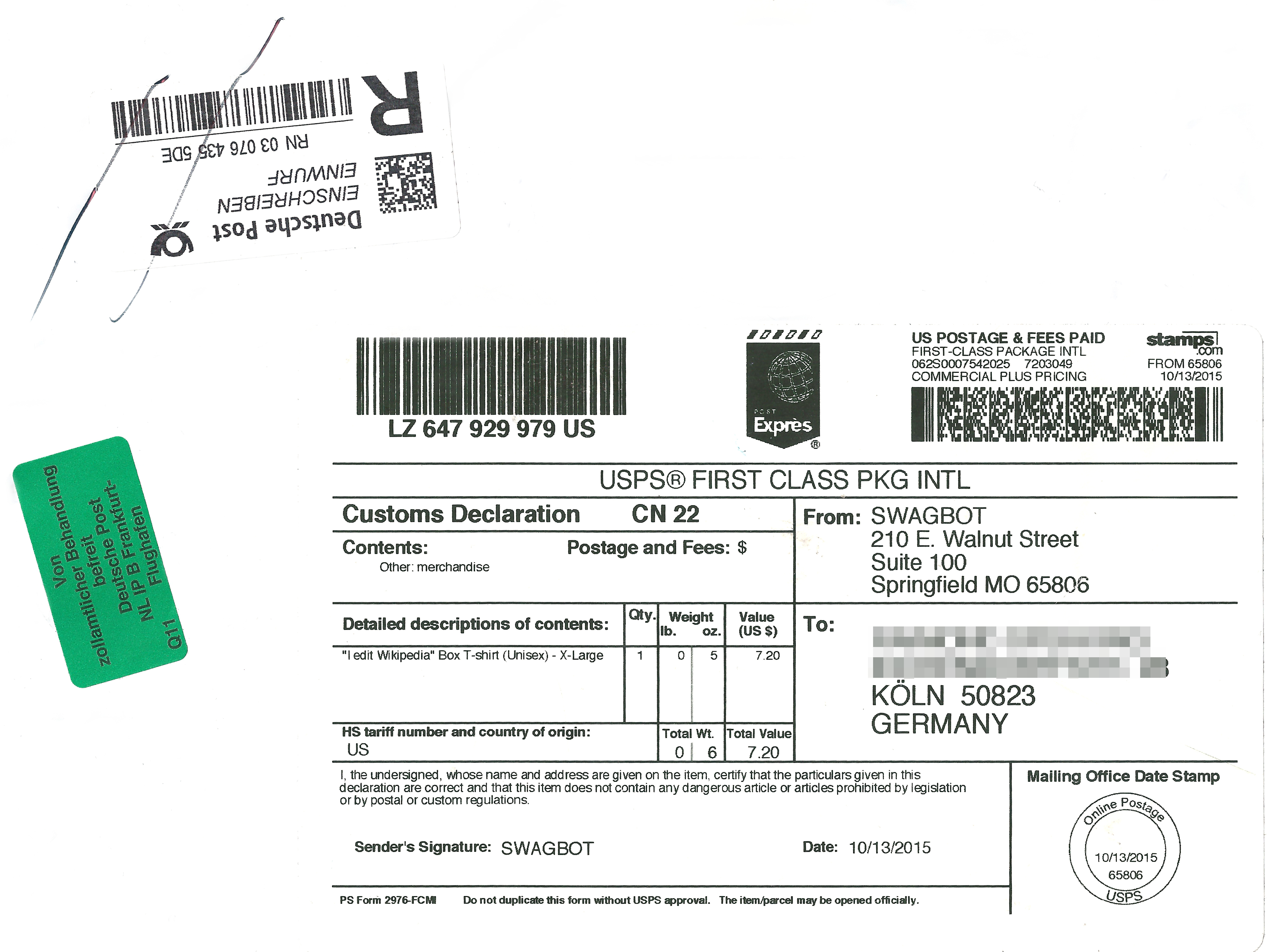
USPS First Class Package International via stamps.com

Stamps.com allows users to print official United States Postal Service stamps and shipping labels for a monthly subscription fee of $14.99. Stamps.com sends customers a digital scale to weigh letters and packages to ensure the correct amount of postage is applied to the piece of mail. The amount of postage applied is then deducted from the customer's Stamps.com account. Customers can print postage on envelopes, regular paper or adhesive labels. The system integrates with external address books applications including Outlook and Act!, small business applications such as Microsoft Word and Intuit's QuickBooks, and e-commerce platforms such as eBay, Shopify, Magento, and Amazon.com.

=== PhotoStamps ===
Stamps.com also offered a product called PhotoStamps that allows customers to upload personal photographs or logos to be printed on real U.S. postage stamps. PhotoStamps were sold as a sheet of 20 postage stamps. The service was discontinued on June 10, 2020 after the USPS discontinued its customized postage program.

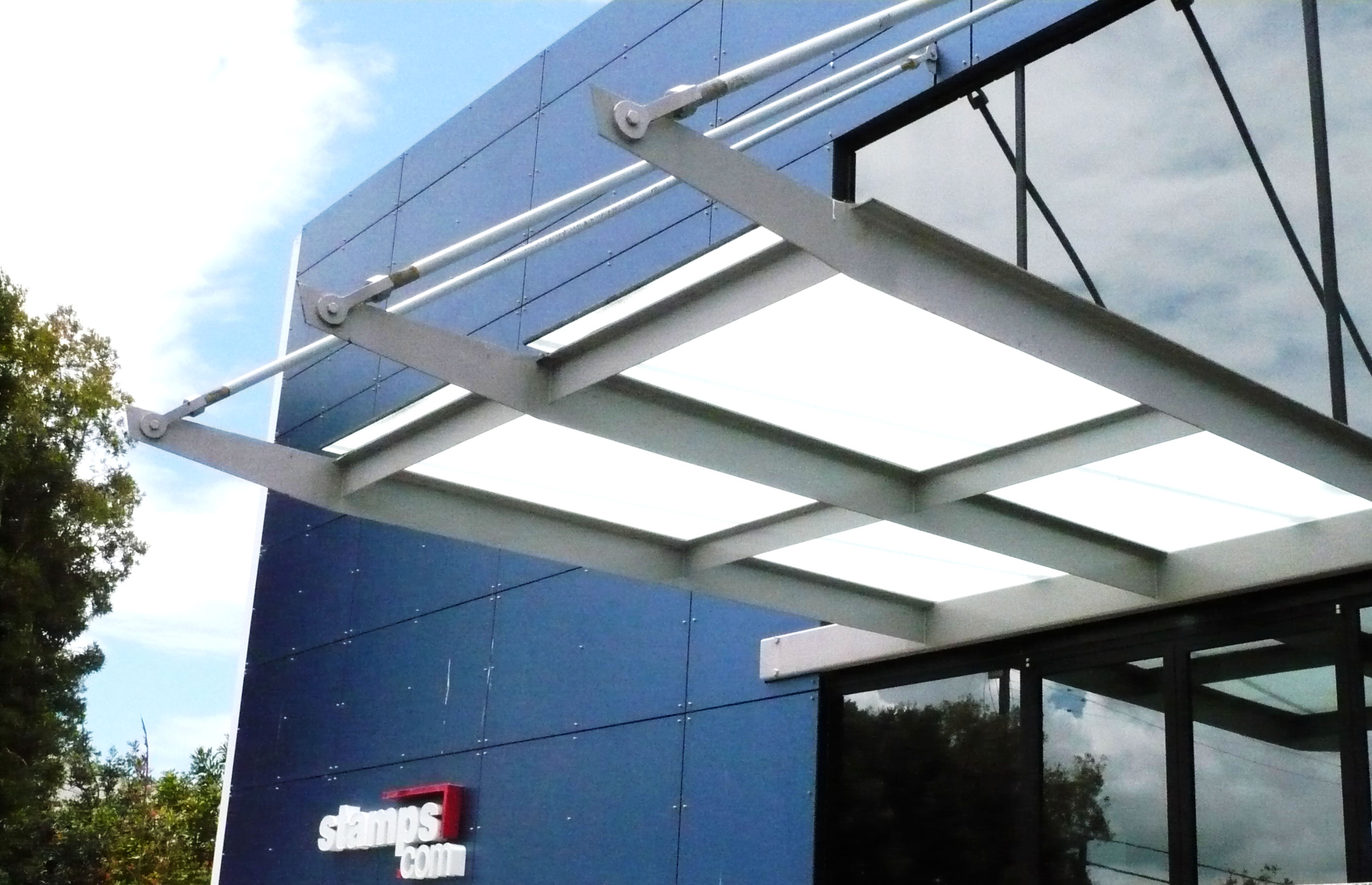
Stamps.com Corporate headquarters. Los Angeles, California.

== Controversies ==
In 2004, the website The Smoking Gun successfully ordered PhotoStamps with controversial images, but Stamps.com updated their policy to prohibit images of world leaders or "any material that is vintage in appearance or depicts images from an older era." The PhotoStamps program was ended by the USPS in 2020.

In 2006, Salim Kara, credited by the USPS as the inventor of PC Postage, and his company Kara Technology, Inc. filed a patent infringement lawsuit against Stamps.com, alleging misappropriation of technology related to online postage systems. The case was resolved in 2010 through a settlement. According to a Stamps.com press release dated July 27, 2010, the company agreed to pay Kara Technology US$5.1 million to settle all claims, purchase the patents asserted in the litigation for US$0.4 million, and grant 35,000 stock options to Salim Kara. In total, the settlement was valued at US$5.5 million.

Stamps.com settled a $2.5 million consumer protection lawsuit from the State of California in 2015 over free trials that eventually converted into monthly service fees. The press release cited "false and misleading advertising", which was corroborated by independent tech publishers. Stamps.com maintains that such charges are valid and well-explained.

In 2015, Stamps.com settled with Express 1, aka Rapid Enterprises, for $10 million as a result of a dispute arising from the Stamps.com acquisition of ShipStation.

In 2021, the company agreed to a $100 million settlement in a 2019 class-action lawsuit alleging that the company had misled investors about the strength of their relationship with the USPS.

== See also ==
- Pitney Bowes
- Endicia Internet Postage
- Salim Kara
