= Chunara =

Ethnic group in state of Gujarat in India

The Chunara are an ethnic group found in the state of Gujarat in India. A small number are also found in the port city of Rajshathan in . There are now one communities of Chunara, one Hindu

== Origin ==
The word chunara in Gujarati literally means someone who manufactures chuna (lime). According to their traditions, they were originally Rajputs who migrated from Rajasthan to Gujarat and joined the army of the Gaekwars of Baroda. After having a fallout with their employer, the Maratha ruler of Baroda, they took to manufacturing lime. A section of the Chunara then converted to Islam, and there are now distinct Chunara communities, one Hindu and the other Muslim.
