= Ghari (sweet) =

Gujatari dish

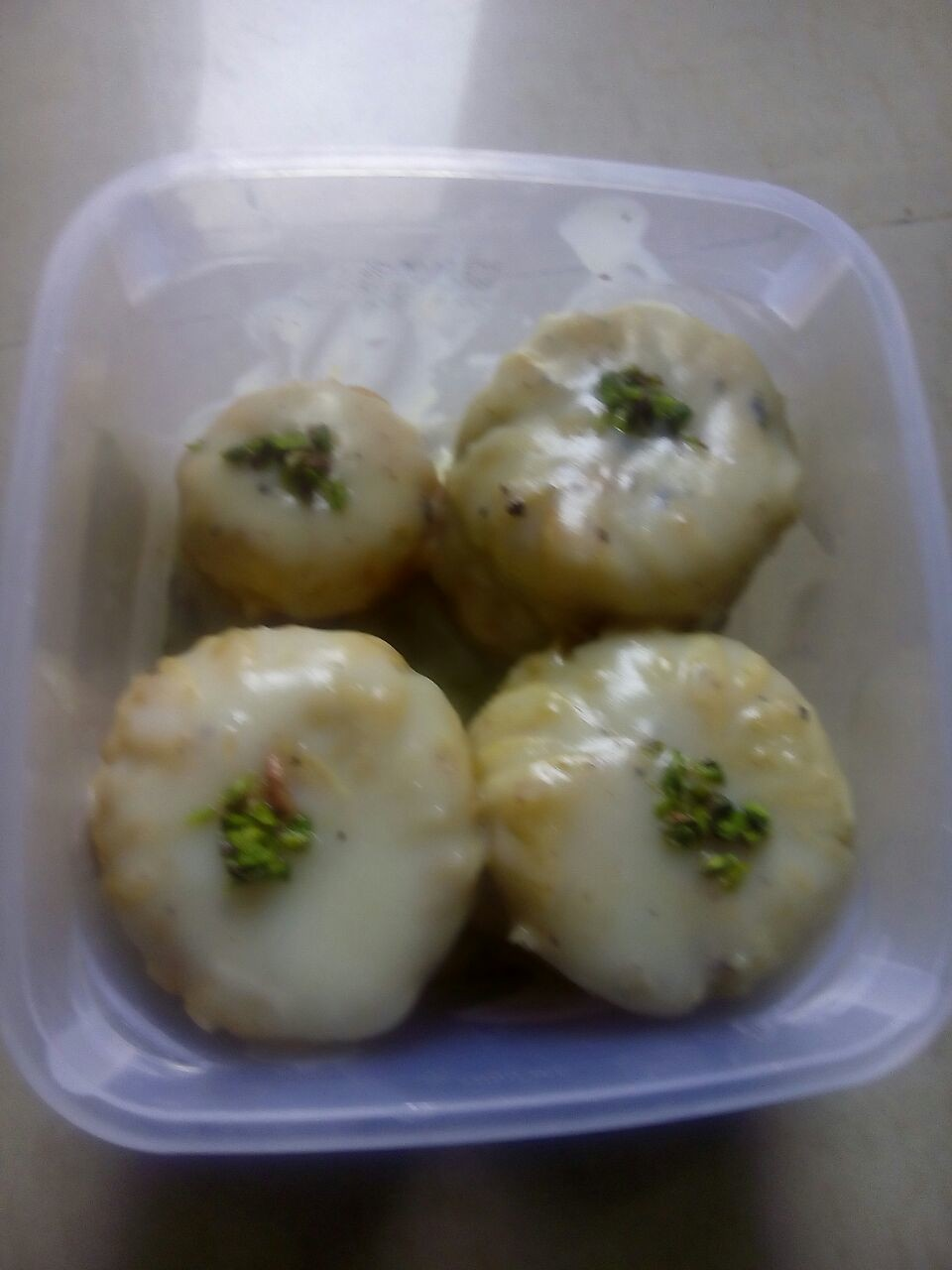
- Surati Ghari
- Type: Sweet
- Place of origin: Surat, India
- Region or state: Gujarat, India
- Main ingredients: Khoya, Ghee, Dry Fruit, Bura Sugar
- Variations: Pista Ghari, Kesar Ghari, Dry Fruit Ghari
- Other information: Origin of Surat, Gujarat, India

Ghari or Surati Ghari is a sweet Gujarati dish from Surat, Gujarat, India. Ghari is made of puri batter, milk 'mawa', ghee and sugar – made into round shapes with sweet filling, to be consumed on Chandani Padva festival. It is also available in many varieties and flavours such as pistachio, almond-elachi and mawa.

Priest Nirmaladasji referred Devshankar Shukla to make Ghari in 1838.

Ghari was prepared by the Devshankar Shukla for Tatya Tope to provide extra strength to the freedom fighter's soldiers in 1857. It began to be consumed in the crematorium for peace to the soul of the dead particularly by people of some castes. (Gujarati Modi Ghanchi and Khatri)
