= Endicia =

American internet postage company

- Company type: Subsidiary
- Founded: 1980; 46 years ago
- Founder: Harry Whitehouse; Amine Khechfé; Scott Montgomery
- Headquarters: Palo Alto, California, U.S.
- Parent: Auctane
- Website: endicia.com

Endicia is an internet postage service provider based in Mountain View, California. It integrates with ShipStation on USPS postage to print labels and manage shipping.

== History ==
Endicia was founded as a technology consultant known as PSI Associates by Harry Whitehouse, Amine Khechfé, and Scott Montgomery in Palo Alto, California. One of PSI's earliest customers was the USPS, to develop a solution that would print the POSTNET (Postal Numeric Encoding Technique) barcode used to sort and process mail directly on an envelope. This led to the development of Endicia and its partnership with the USPS. In the early 2000s, PSI rebranded first to Envelope Manager Software and then to Endicia Internet Postage. On July 2, 2007, Newell Rubbermaid announced the acquisition of Endicia as part of its foray into "innovative technologies and solutions around the world". In 2010, Endicia was renamed DYMO Endicia. On June 4, 2013, the company returned to the name Endicia.

In 2009, La Poste, the French Postal Service, partnered with Endicia to launch MonTimbrenLigne, a service that allows La Poste customers to print their own postage.

In March 2015, Stamps.com entered into an agreement to acquire Endicia from Newell Rubbermaid for approximately $215 million. Endicia integrated with ShipStation in 2025.
