= Varaiya =

The Varaiya are a Jain community with origins in the Gujarat, India. This community is part of Jain sect.

Varaiya is also a surname. Notable people with the surname may or may not be affiliated with Jain community include:

- Hiren Varaiya (born 1984), Kenyan cricketer
- Pravin Varaiya (born 1940), American electrical engineer
