= Salim Kara =

Canadian inventor

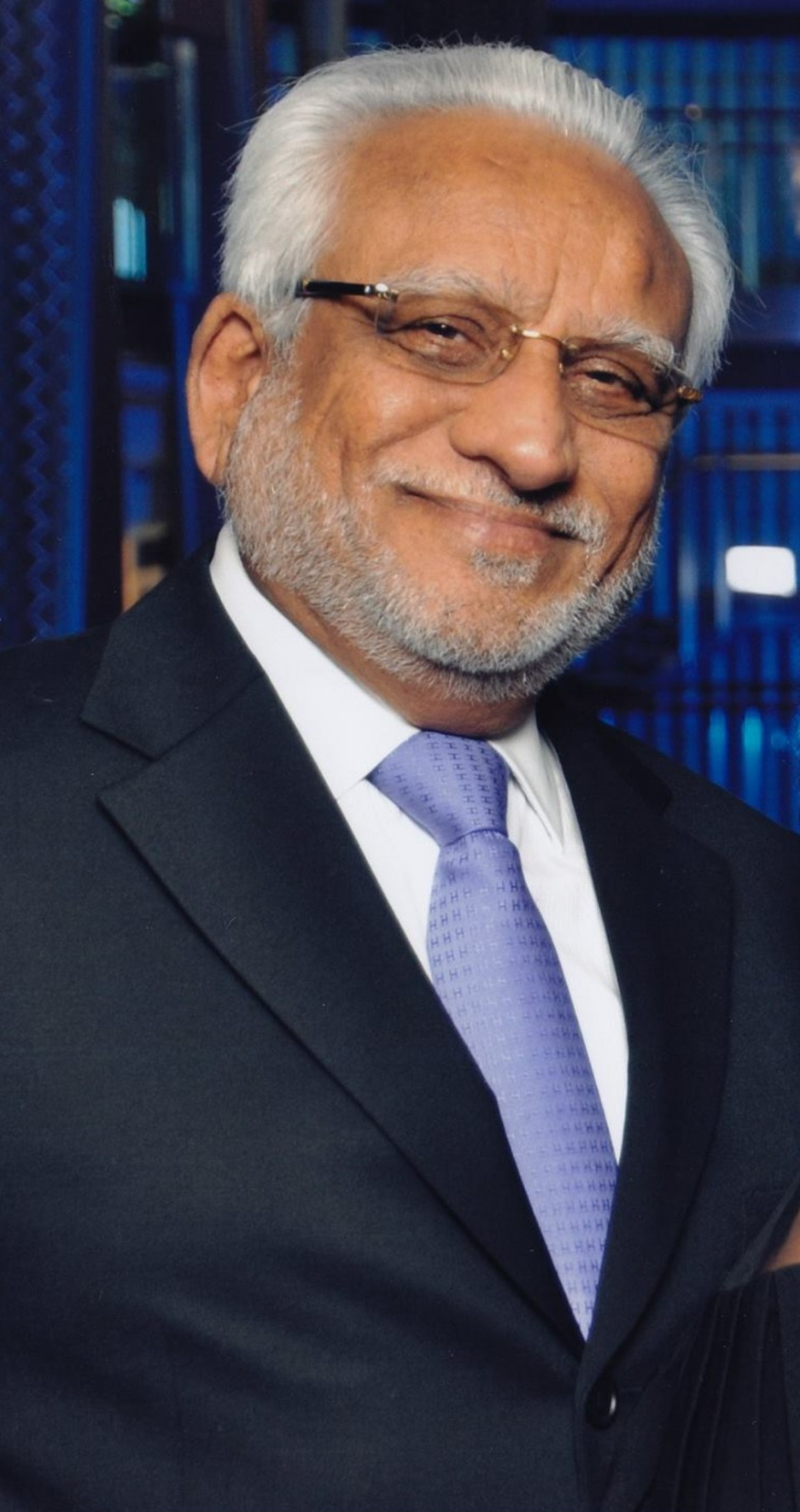
- Born: June 1, 1949 (age 77); Zanzibar, Tanzania
- Citizenship: Canada (1978)
- Occupations: Inventor, Entrepreneur
- Organization(s): Kara Technology, Inc. E-Stamp Corporation iMobile Payment myiStamp Inc. Kara Vault Inc.
- Known for: PC Postage
- Spouses: Yasmin Kara (m. 1972; died 2013): Shainaaz Kara (m. 2016)
- Children: Shairose Kara; Alykhan Kara; Alnoor Kara

Salim G. Kara (born June 1, 1949) is an Indian-origin Tanzanian-born Canadian inventor, and Founder-CEO of Kara Technology, Inc., E-Stamp Corporation and iMobile Payment. As well as the co-founder of myiStamp Inc. and Kara Vault, Inc. He is credited with creating digital postage and is known as its inventor. He holds over 90 patents, 44 of which were issued in the United States.

== Career ==
Kara migrated to Toronto in 1974 and started a refrigeration business with his two brothers, Sultan and Shiraz Kara. In 1993, he invented 'PC Postage'. In 1994, he secured several patents on a PC-rendered postage stamp. Kara founded a company in Houston, Texas – E-Stamp Corporation – to bring the concept of PC Postage to the American public after first satisfying the United States Postal Service and its consultants at Carnegie Mellon University that the concept could be implemented without risk to Postal Service revenues.

In March 1998, E-stamp got approval by the U.S. Postal Service for the first product under the Information-Based Indicia (IBI) Program that was allowed to produce electronic postage using an off-the-shelf PC. In 1998, Salim Kara left E-Stamp Corporation, paving the way for it to publicly trade with a market capitalization exceeding US$1 billion. In 2001, the technology, intellectual property and trade names of E-Stamp were sold to Stamps.com, which has recently been acquired at a valuation of $6.6 Billion, by Thoma Bravo, a leading software investment firm. Following his innovative development of PC Postage, Kara proceeded to develop additional concepts for secure Internet based payment systems operating through Kara Technology and later iMobile Payment, Inc. where he developed additional ordering and payment systems, secure virtual tickets and virtual credit cards. His company's core technology was approved by BlackBerry and he became a BlackBerry ISV Alliance Member in 2006.

In 2016, Salim and his son, Alnoor Kara, co-founded myiStamp Inc. and Kara Vault Inc. They have patents pending on their "Stamps on Demand" and "Smart Collision Certificate" technologies.

== Lawsuit against Stamps.com ==
Kara filed a major patent infringement suit against Stamps.com asserting misappropriation of technology. This litigation resulted in a settlement in which Kara Technology, Inc. was awarded US$5.5 million. A Stamps.com press release stated, “On July 27, 2010, the Company entered into binding terms of a settlement agreement with Kara Technology to resolve all outstanding litigation between the parties. Under the terms of the agreement Stamps.com will make a US$5.1 million payment for settlement of all claims asserted in the litigation, will purchase the patents asserted in the litigation for US$0.4 million, and will grant Salim Kara options on 35,000 shares of Stamps.com stock.”

== Awards and recognition ==
- He received the Future 500 Upside Award for Technical Innovation by the University of Houston, Center for Entrepreneurship and Innovation in 1998.
- He won the Retail Postage Technology Award by U.S. Postal Service.
- He is recognized as the inventor who first produced digital postage, a revolutionary development in postage payment technology by United States Postal Service in March 2000.
