= Chundrigar =

Religious community in India

Regions with significant populations
- • India • Pakistan

Languages
- • Primary language- Gujarati • Urdu • Hindi

Religion
- Islam

The Chundrigar are a Muslim community found in the state of Rajasthan, India. Some members of the community are also found in the city of Karachi, Pakistan.
