= Kantilal Jivan =

Seychellois artist

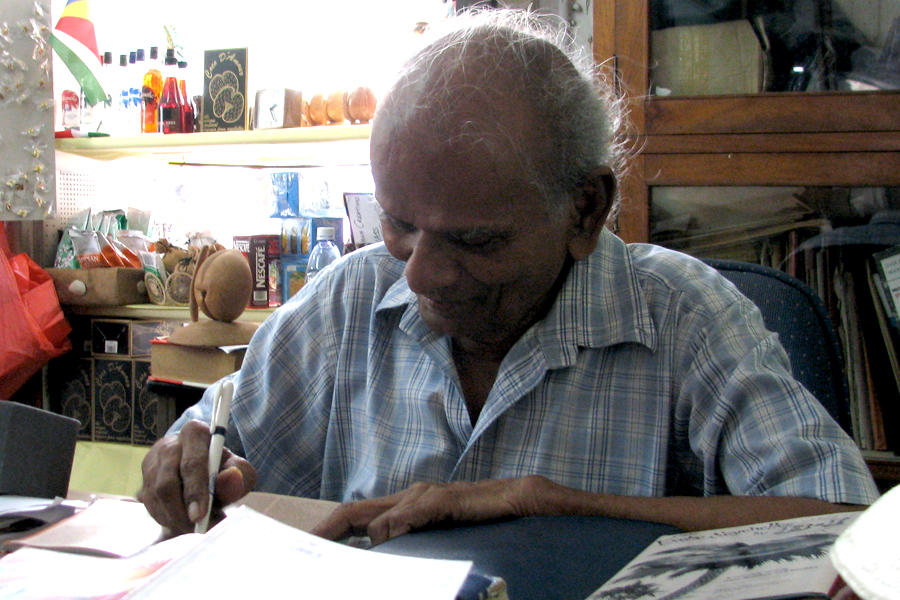
- Kantilal Jivan Shah sitting at a table and holding a pen
- Born: 1922; Gujarat, India
- Died: 2010; Victoria Hospital, Victoria, Seychelles
- Occupation(s): Politician, Historian

Kantilal Jivan Shah (1922–2010), also known as Kanti, was a Seychellois conservationist. He has been described as a guru, historian, natural history expert, palmist, vegetarian cook and teacher, photographer, artist and sculptor, agronomist and intellectual.

== Early life ==
In 1922, Shah was born in Gujarat, India. When he was five years old, his family moved to Seychelles.

== Career ==
Shah ran an export and import business established by his father in 1890, conducted through a colonial store in Victoria purchased by his family in 1925. His store, named Jivan Imports, sold textiles and local souvenirs, with his living space and library located on the second floor. He was better known for his environmentalism and ecotourism work in Seychelles and as a leading historian and folklorist. He was a committee member of various organizations such as the Alliance Francaise, the Chamber of Commerce and Industry and the Seychelles Environment Trust Fund.

=== Works ===
Shah produced the first coloured calendars and postcards for the governor of Seychelles using his own photographs.

Shah contributed to a booklet titled The History of Paper Currency in the Seychelles, published on June 29, 2006, to coincide with the 30th anniversary of Seychellois independence.

=== Environmentalism ===
Shah was involved in conservation and environmental activities, including raising public awareness, creation of national parks and nature reserves like the Ste. Anne Marine National Park and Port Launay Marine National Park, and protective legislation for marine life, such as the Protection of Shells Act, Animal and Bird Protection, Controlled Cropping of Seabirds' Eggs, and Protection of Turtles.

=== Politics ===
In 1965, Shah was elected to Victoria District Council to represent the Pier Ward. He later acted as chairman.

=== Media presence ===
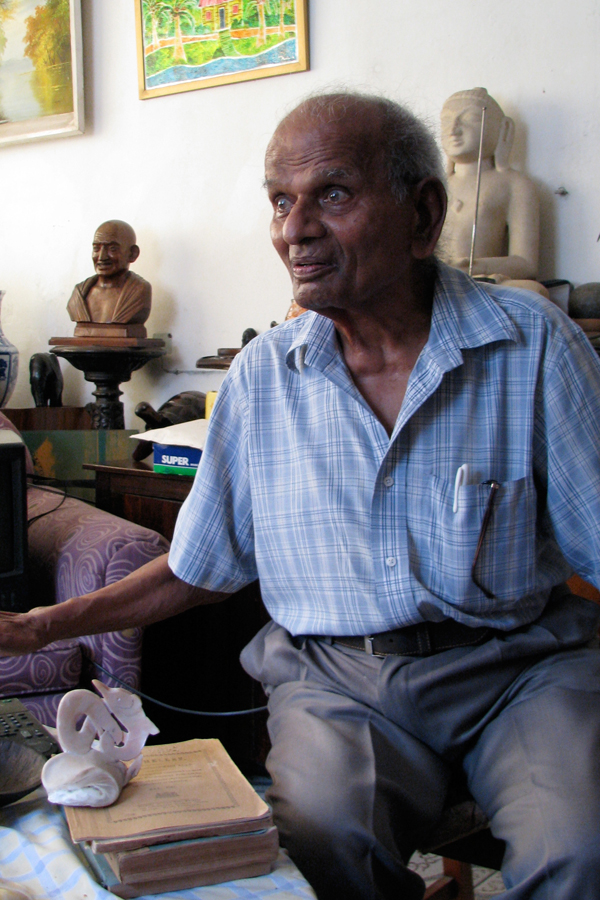
Kantilal Jivan Shah seated

Shah promoted Seychelles globally through magazines, TV programmes, newspapers and guides, and was also featured in international media, such as in programmes and broadcasts from Germany, the United Kingdom, and the United States. He was a host to some influential global personalities like Queen Elizabeth II and Mother Teresa to Ian Fleming, the creator of James Bond. The latter featured Jivan as a character in his last Bond novel. He also acted in a movie with the actor Omar Sharif.

=== Awards and memberships ===
Shah was included in the UN Environmental Program Global 500 Roll of Honour as an adult award winner in 1990 for over 30 years of conservation work. He also became a Fellow of the Royal Geographical Society in 1990. Shah was honoured by the Royal Norwegian Academy of Sciences and Letters.

== Death ==
Shah died in 2010 at the age of 88 in Victoria Hospital. He was survived by his son Nirmal Shah, the chief executive of Nature Seychelles.
