= Dabhi =

Rajput clan

The Dabhi is a Rajput clan of Gujarat in India. The name is also found among the Indian Kolis.

== Notable people ==
People with the surname Dabhi, who may or may not be associated with the clan, include:

- Ajitsinh Dabhi
- Bharatsinhji Dabhi
- Kalabhai Dabhi
- Reena Dabhi
