= Indicia =

Indicia may refer to:

- Indicia (philately), markings on a mail piece showing that postage has been paid by the sender
- Indicia (publishing), a piece of text traditionally appearing on the first recto page after the cover, which usually contains the official name of the publication
- Information Based Indicia, a system used by the United States Postal Service
