= McInroy =

McInroy is a surname. Notable people with the surname include:

- Albert McInroy (1901–1985), English footballer
- Ian McInroy (born 1979), Scottish rugby union player

== See also ==
- McInroy Collection, a stamp collection of the British Library Philatelic Collections
- McInroy's Point, a peninsula in western Scotland
