= Facing Identification Mark =

Postal mark

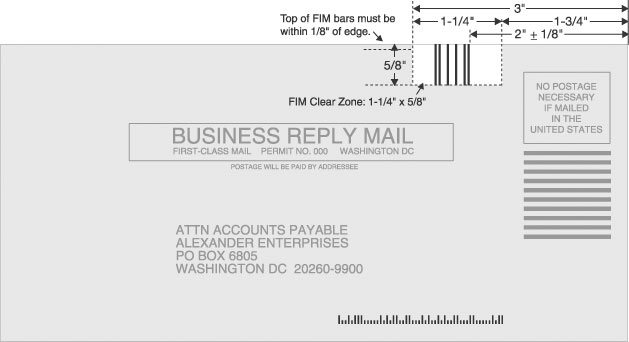
Diagram showing placement of the FIM (FIM C in this example) on a reply mailer

The Facing Identification Mark, or FIM, is a bar code designed by the United States Postal Service to assist in the automated processing of mail. The FIM is a set of vertical bars printed on the envelope or postcard near the upper edge, just to the left of the postage area (the area where the postage stamp or its equivalent is placed). The FIM is intended for use primarily on preprinted envelopes and postcards and is applied by the company printing the envelopes or postcards, not by the USPS.

The FIM is a nine-bit code consisting of ones (vertical bars) and zeroes (blank spaces). The following five codes are in use:

- FIM A: || | || (110010011)
- FIM B: | || || | (101101101)
- FIM C: || | | || (110101011)
- FIM D: ||| | ||| (111010111)
- FIM E: | | | | (101000101)

All defined FIMs start and end with a bar, and are palindromic, reading the same forward and backward. Thus, there are only 16 possible FIMs, 11 if the current limits of at most 3 consecutive bars or spaces are maintained.

The FIM allows the proper facing of mail for cancellation. It also identifies the manner in which postage is paid (e.g., business reply mail or Information Based Indicia (IBI) postage) and whether that business reply mail has a barcode, typically an Intelligent Mail Barcode or the older POSTNET barcode. If the barcode is present, the mail can be sent directly to a sorter.

The five codes have the following uses:

- FIM A is used for mail bearing regular postage and an Intelligent Mail Barcode. It is commonly used by preprinted courtesy reply mail and metered reply mail, but may be applied to any mail to speed delivery.
- FIM B is used for business reply mail without a preprinted barcode. Because this costs more than barcoded mail, it is rarely used.
- FIM C is used for business reply mail with a preprinted Intelligent Mail Barcode.
- FIM D is used only with IBI postage.
- FIM E is used to mark Share Mail, where the Intelligent Mail Barcode is used as postage.
