= Courtesy reply mail =

Self-addressed mail sent by businesses requiring postage from respondent

Courtesy reply mail, or CRM, is a type of mail in which a business sends pre-printed, self-addressed envelopes or postcards to customers, who then affix postage stamps to the envelopes or postcards and mail them back to the business. The business can also disseminate the envelopes or postcards with stamps affixed, similarly to metered reply mail.

Courtesy reply mail differs from business reply mail in the manner of payment of postage, namely, by stamp when the mail is sent, rather than by the permit holder when the mail is received. Courtesy reply mail is typically used when a response is practically guaranteed, such as bill payments.

In the United States, the United States Postal Service specifies that the envelopes or postcards for courtesy reply mail should be printed with a FIM A code. The POSTNET bar code can be printed on the envelope or postcard. It can also be printed on a payment coupon, so that the bar code is visible through the window of a window envelope when the payment coupon is inserted.
