= Freepost =

Postal service paid for upon receipt

Example freepost business reply mail format: "No postage necessary if mailed in the United States"

Freepost is a postal service provided by various postal administrations, whereby a person sends mail without affixing postage, and the recipient pays the postage when collecting the mail. Freepost differs from self-addressed stamped envelopes, courtesy reply mail, and metered reply mail in that the recipient of the freepost pays only for those items that are actually received, rather than for all that are distributed. Freepost of preprinted cards issued by businesses is also different from postal stationery sold by postal administrations.

== Uses ==
In one use of freepost, a business sends bulk mail to potential customers, the bulk mail including envelopes or postcards that potential customers can return to the business by freepost. In another use, magazines include subscription cards that potential subscribers can return by freepost. In another use, a seller can provide a merchandise return label bearing the appropriate freepost indicia (as described below) to a customer so that the customer can return the item to the seller by freepost upon issuance of a Return Merchandise Authorization.

A non-commercial use would be to return lost items belonging to a business. The item will have printed on the back "if found please return by freepost to <address>". For example, UK's NHS worker's RFID access cards can be returned by freepost if lost & found.

== By country ==
=== Australia ===
In Australia, freepost is called Reply Paid. Specially printed envelopes maybe used, with the permit holder's address, the words "Reply Paid" with an authorization number. The stamp is replaced by three vertical black stripes and a postal bar code. The permit holder pays the postage plus a fee to the postal authority. The customer may also write the Reply Paid envelope out by hand, which is treated the same as the printed envelopes. The delivery address is printed on the top left hand corner of the envelope. The delivery address may be the same as the postcode.

No stamp required if posted in Australia
. . . .
. . . .
. . . .
. . . .
. . . .

Delivery Address:
PO Box 1435
ALEXANDRIA NSW 1435

An important customer could have an RP number the same as the post code and the delivery address PO Box, to minimize errors even more.

Red Cross
Reply Paid 1435
ALEXANDRIA NSW 1435

=== Canada ===
To coordinate service with the United States, Canada Post uses the same terminology and the same standards as the USPS (as explained below), with the exception of the use of Canadian Postal codes.

=== United States ===
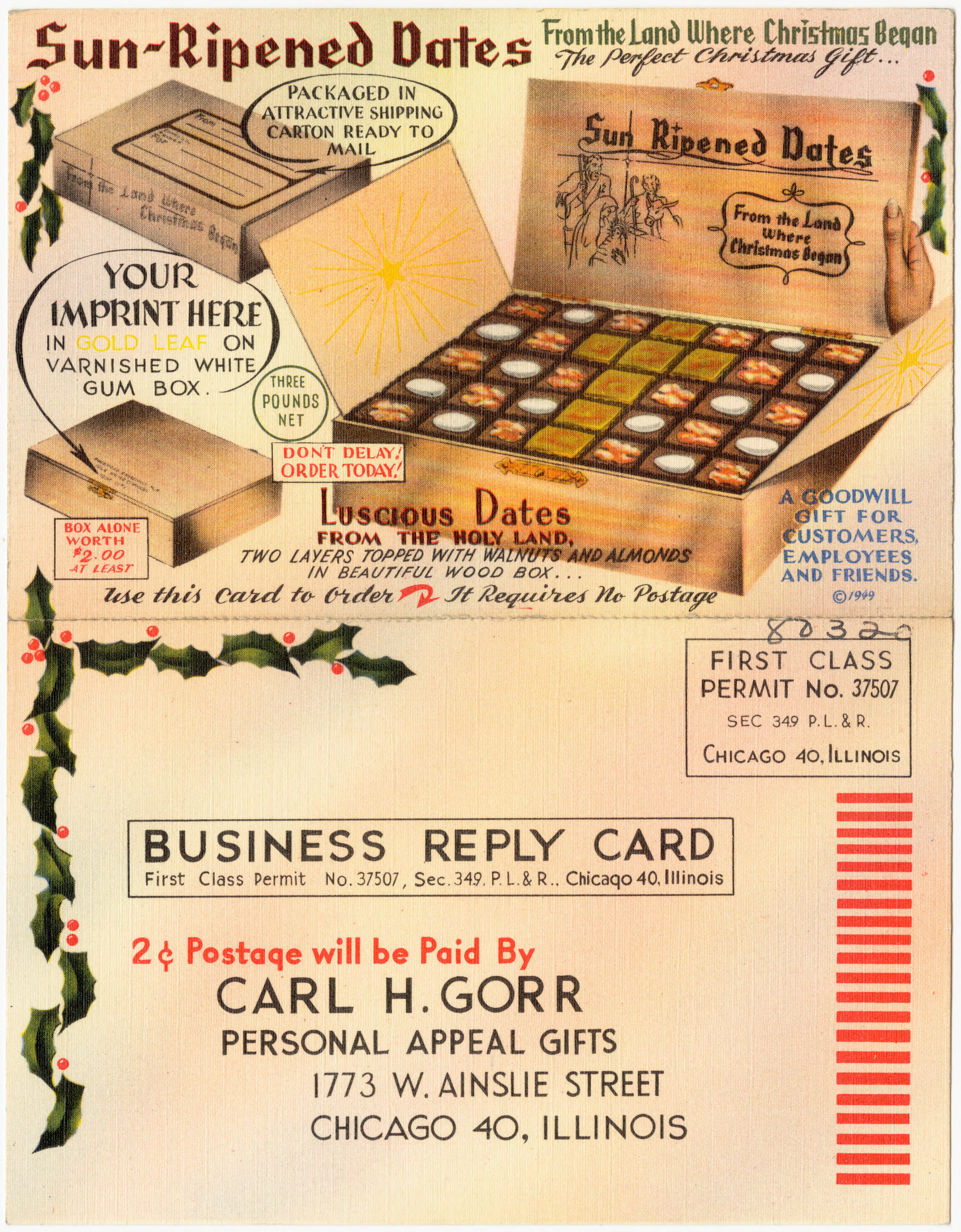
A US advertisement c. 1949 with a freepost section: "Use this card to order - it requires no postage"

In the United States, the United States Postal Service refers to freepost as business reply mail. A mailer wishing to receive mail by freepost must obtain a business reply permit and design the envelopes, postcards, or labels according to the standards specified by the USPS, including the use of an appropriate FIM B or C code. The address on the envelope, postcard, or label is the same as the address for regular mail, except that the ZIP+4 code is different. In some large cities, business reply mail has its own five-digit ZIP code or codes (e.g., 20077 and 20078 in Washington, D.C.). The envelope or postcard also includes space for the business reply permit number.

=== United Kingdom ===
In the United Kingdom, Royal Mail offers a variety of services. The most expensive service, Freepost Name, enables a customer to purchase a licence to a name which allows the public to send mail to the organisation free of charge using any envelope, and with the Freepost Name handwritten or printed. Only the licensed name is required on the envelope, not the postal address. Freepost with a licence number and full address written by the customer can be used for parcel items. In addition, Royal Mail offers a range of business reply services enabling a business to provide their customers with pre-printed envelopes in order to send mail to the business free of charge, including: Freepost Standard, Freepost Plus, Business Reply Standard, Business Reply Plus.

=== New Zealand ===
In NZ, freepost envelopes can be hand addressed by the sender; this simply requires including the word 'FREEPOST' and the recipient's name or permit number as part of the address. (This technique can not be used to send mail to merely anyone, who would then have to pay for it; the permit number and the recipient address must match for the recipient to be billed.)

=== The Netherlands ===
In the Netherlands, freepost is addressed exactly the same as normal mail. The recipient needs a special address: an answering number (antwoordnummer in Dutch). The sender can distinguish these addresses because they include the word 'antwoordnummer' and may choose whether or not to use a stamp. When no stamp is used, the recipient pays the costs plus a fee, but when the sender uses a stamp, no extra costs are made.

=== Finland ===
In Finland, there are two types of freepost. In the first one, which is used on orders that a company has sent and the customer wants to return it (for example, an order from an e-commerce store), the customer can use the same envelope the company sent and simply write PALAUTUS or ASIAKASPALAUTUS ('RETURN' or 'CUSTOMER RETURN'). The company must have a contract with the Finnish postal service Itella.

The other option is to use following form:

Company name
Tunnus: 12345
00003 VASTAUSLÄHETYS

Where tunnus means 'code' and vastauslähetys means 'return delivery'. Postal code is always same for these deliveries. There is usually some text indicating that postage is paid on the upper-right corner. (where stamp would be located) Companies can, however design this text, or image, themselves to match the company logo instead of using the standard one. The company must also have contract with Itella. The address may be handwritten by the customer.

=== Germany ===
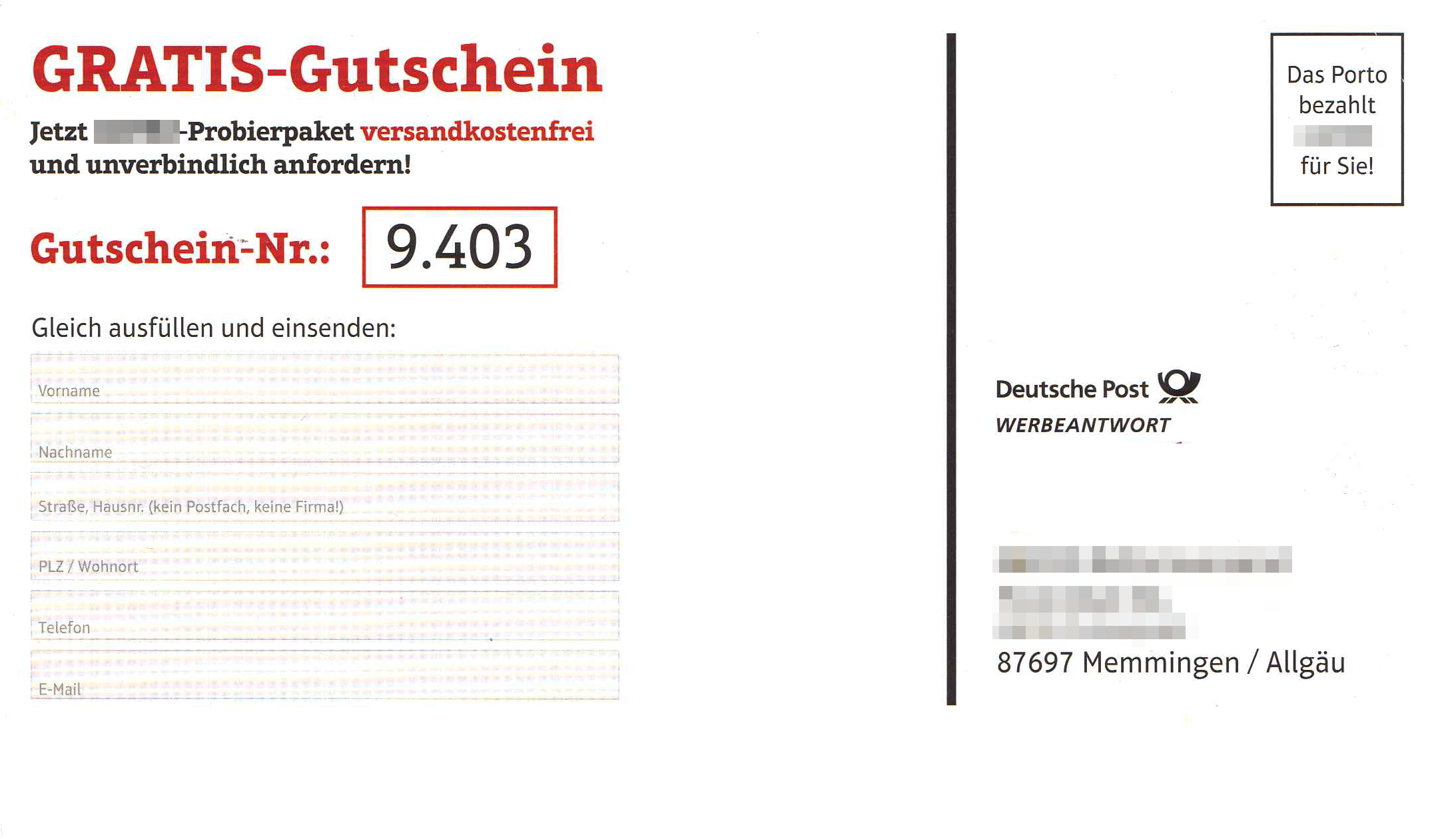
Post Card for ordering a trial packet, where the fee for the post card delivery is paid by the recipient

Where the stamp would be affixed normally on the envelope, a box with the words "Porto zahlt Empfänger" ("postage paid by recipient") or "Bitte frankieren, falls Marke zur Hand" ("please place a stamp if one is at hand") is printed. The recipient then has the choice to accept or deny the envelope upon delivery. The sentence "Porto zahlt Empfänger" can be written on the envelope by the sender, too, if they don't want to pay for the postage - though the recipient is not forced to accept and pay for the postage so that the system cannot be misused by senders. If neither the sender nor the recipient wants to pay for the postage, the envelope and its contents will be destroyed.

=== More generally ===
Other countries use freepost as well, although the envelope designs required by those countries' postal authorities differ widely from that described above. A freepost address may have a special freepost number for use along with, or instead of, the address for regular mail.

== International Business Reply Service (IBRS) ==
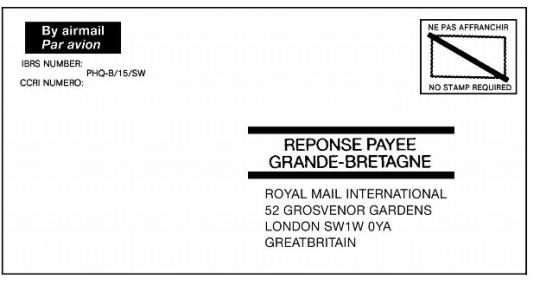
Example of an International Business Reply Service envelope that would be accepted by the United States Postal Service for free delivery to addresses outside the USA

International freepost is known variously as 'International Business Reply Service', 'International Business Reply Mail', 'International Business Response Service', 'IBRS' and, in French, Correspondance Commerciale-Réponse Internationale (CCRI). Like USPS business reply mail, international business reply mail must conform to certain format requirements, including the prominent notice "REPONSE PAYEE" (French for "reply paid"), and a number indicating the account that will pay for the postage. International Business Reply Service is a convenient way for international customers to reply to the sender with pre-paid cards and envelopes, at no cost to them.

== See also ==
- Toll-free telephone number
