= Windowed envelope =

Envelope with clear area for recipient's name

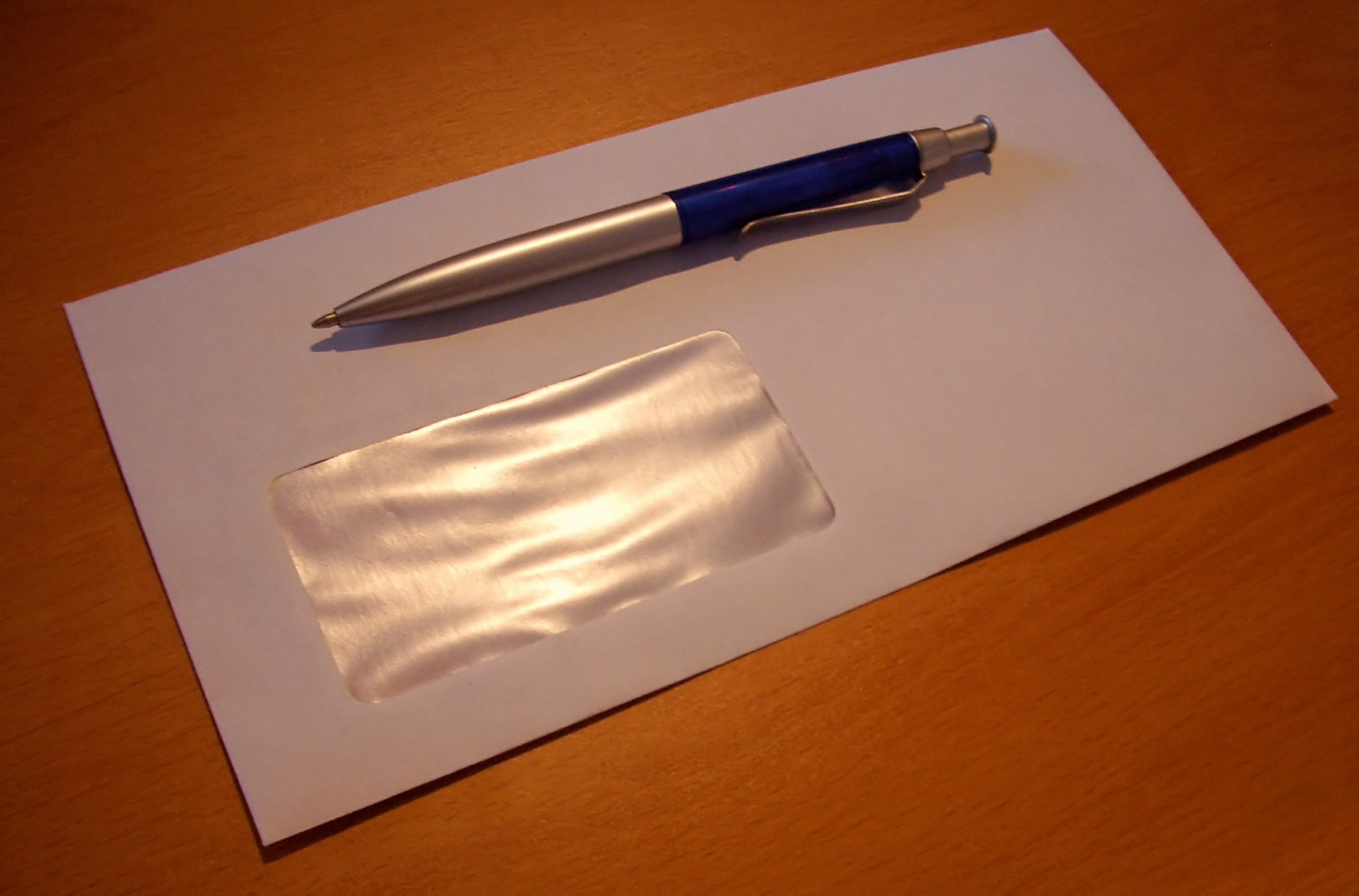
Modern envelope with a single window for the recipient address

A windowed envelope is a conventional envelope with a transparent (typically PET or BOPS Bi-oriented polystyrene plastic film) window to allow the recipient's address to be printed on the paper contained within.

== History ==
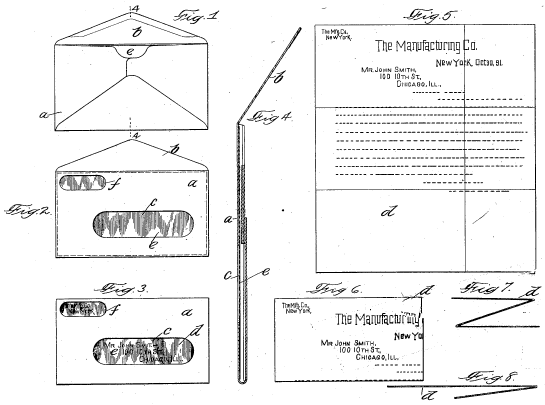
US Patent 701,839 for a windowed envelope

Americus F. Callahan of Chicago, Illinois, in the United States, received the first patent for a windowed envelope on 10 June 1902. Originally called the "outlook envelop", the patent initially anticipated using thin Washi paper as the transparent material forming the window. That material was soon replaced by glassine and by the end of the century, clear plastics; some uses omit the film entirely, leaving an open cut-out. The design has otherwise remained nearly unchanged.

The design and patent letter were completed on 15 November 1901, with the patent filing occurring on 9 December 1901. The United States patent number for Callahan's design is 701,839.

Callahan specifically recommended the use of Manila paper, which is considerably cheaper than thicker writing paper and also provides an opaque background for secure covering of the letter within. Callahan also recommends the use of black paper, which would likewise provide an opaque background whilst simultaneously increasing the contrast with the white address blocks.

== Advantages and disadvantages ==
The window permits text on the letter itself to be used simultaneously as the address of the recipient and the return-address of the sender, reducing the need to print the addresses onto the envelope itself, which at the time of Callahan's invention was done with the aid of a typewriter. This arguably amounts to a savings in materials, particularly through the reduction in ink usage; but on the other hand the window has to be cut out and sometimes replaced by an additional material called a patch (originally glassine but now plastic). This makes the envelope more expensive. There is also the argument that the paper of the envelope can be substituted with lesser-quality paper as the envelope no longer must be written upon; this perhaps was more relevant at the time of Callahan's invention but is a somewhat specious claim today. Over time the quality of paper generally has improved. Satisfactorily-strong envelopes for business and general-purpose domestic correspondence can be, and are, in fact made out of paper of various qualities. In Britain by the 1940s, during World War 2, envelopes were made out of newspaper because of the paper shortage.

Additional savings can be achieved by removing the time spent inscribing additional addresses upon the envelope. At the time, large business offices—particularly within the telegram industry—employed corps of envelope addressers who wrote the addresses upon envelopes. In addition to the labor costs, this method was prone to mismatches, where the address on the letter header within would not be the same as the address upon the envelope.

Providing a windowed envelope for returning a bill payment forces the payee to return the bill's tear-off stub with the payment, making it easier to ensure the payment is credited to the correct account.

Owing to the benefits in both time, cost, and quality, the windowed envelope design has become nearly ubiquitous among modern commercial mailings.

Regarding recycling after use: plastic windows are not normally a problem for paper mills as the window can usually be easily screened out during the manufacturing process.
