= Meter stamp =

Impression made on a stamp by a postage meter

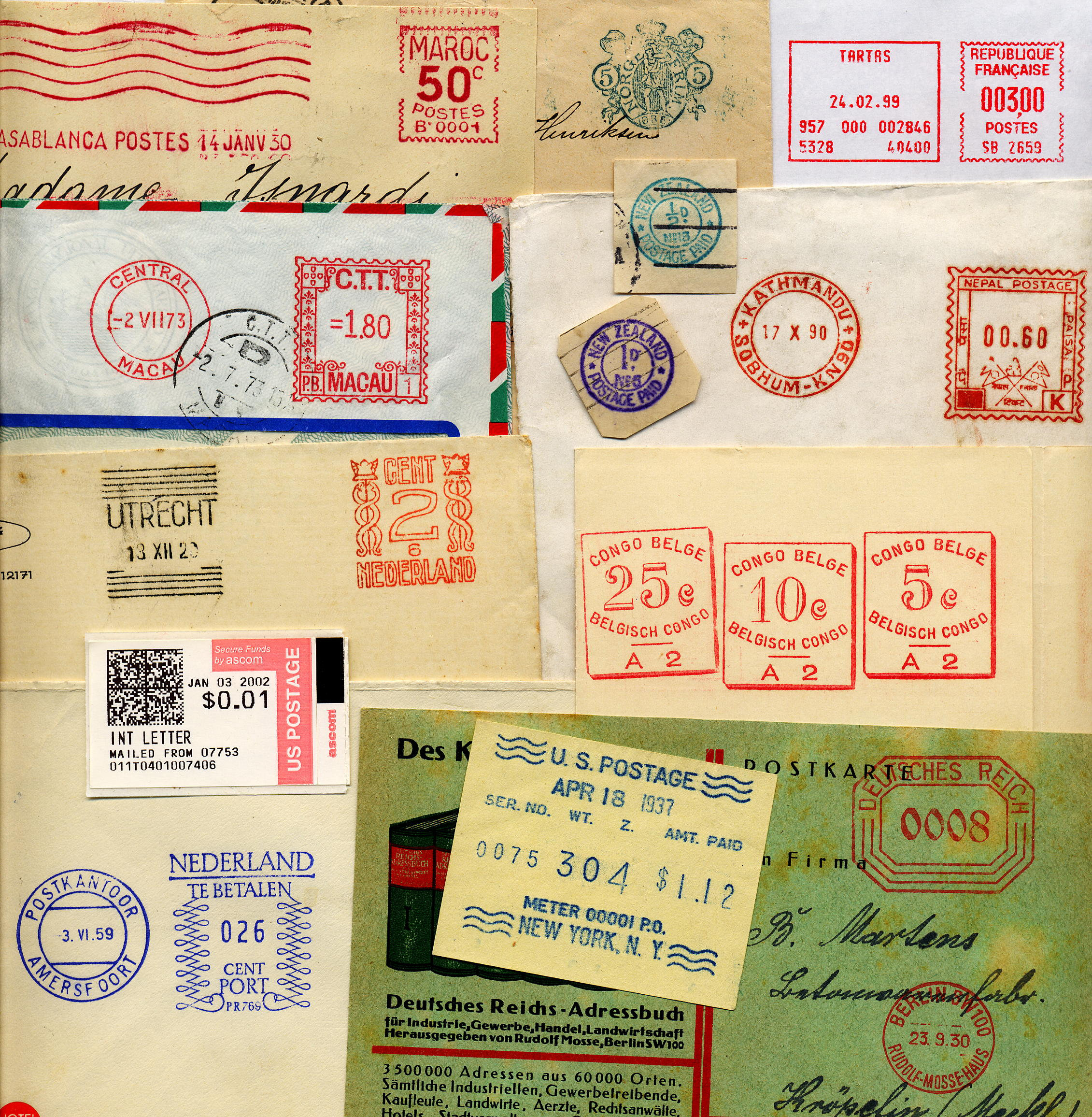
A selection of meter stamps

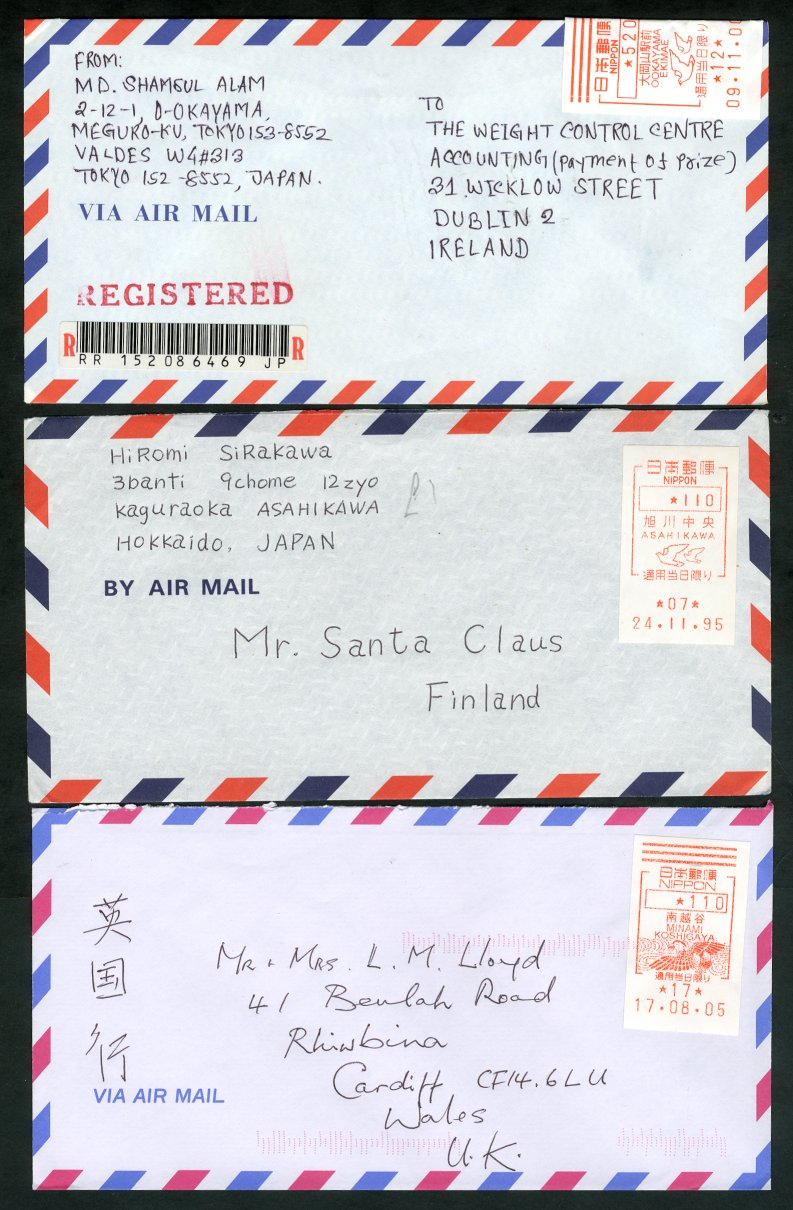
A selection of Japanese meter franked airmail letters

A meter stamp, or meter mark, is the impression made by a postage meter machine that indicates that postage has been paid on a letter or parcel. Meter stamps are widely used by businesses and organisations as they are more efficient than using postage stamps.

Meter stamps are not adhesive postage stamps in the normal sense, although they may be printed on adhesive labels before being applied to mail. Meter stamps are normally in red, although a variety of colours are found.

== Components of a meter stamp ==
The usual components of a meter stamp are:

- The country of issue.
- The date.
- The postal value.
- The license number.
- The meter manufacturer. (optional)
- A slogan relating to the user. (optional)

== UPU approval ==
The international use of meter marks was approved by the Universal Postal Union in 1920, effective 1 January 1922.

== Forgeries ==
Meter stamps can be forged like any other stamp. In the 1990s, fraudsters in Nigeria began to forge meter stamps using a rubber stamp in connection with 419 scams as applying a rubber stamp to letters was much cheaper than even the forged stamps they had previously used.

== Revenue stamps ==
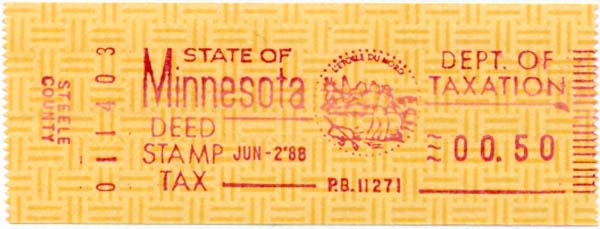
Minnesota state revenue stamp (1988)

Meter stamps can be used as a form of revenue stamp.

== See also ==
- Indicia (philately)
- McInroy Collection A collection of meter stamps in the British Library Philatelic Collections.
