= Metered reply mail =

Self-addressed mail sent by businesses with postage already paid

Metered reply mail, or MRM, is a type of mail in which a business sends pre-printed, self-addressed envelopes or postcards to customers, with postage prepaid on the envelopes or postcards with a postage meter. It is thus similar to courtesy reply mail with a postage stamp already affixed.

Metered reply mail differs from business reply mail in the manner of payment of postage, namely, by the postage meter indicating when the mail is sent, rather than by the permit holder when the mail is received.

In the United States, the United States Postal Service specifies that the envelopes or postcards for metered reply mail should be printed with a FIM A code.

== See also ==
- Self-addressed stamped envelope
