= Self-addressed stamped envelope =

Postage-paid envelope for return service

A self-addressed stamped envelope (SASE), stamped self-addressed envelope (SSAE), or stamped addressed envelope (SAE) is an envelope with the sender's name and address on it, plus affixed paid postage, that is mailed to a company or private individual.

== Uses ==
Important uses for SASEs are when requesting information about products or services, or when sending manuscripts to literary agents.

SASEs are used when communicating with companies, charities or celebrities (for fan post), in cases where each recipient can afford the cost of a single stamp and envelope, but it would be a burden on the organization to pay for the postage on all the letters it sends out.

One of the most common uses is when companies are legally required to send something upon request, such as a "winners list" at the end of a sweepstakes; the company will require a SASE to be included with the request to avoid paying postage.

SASEs are also vital in the hobbies of autograph collecting and amateur radio. An enthusiast will send an autograph request to a celebrity or athlete through the mail and include a SASE, which the celebrity or athlete will use to return the autographed item. In the case of amateur radio, operators will send a SASE when requesting another station's QSL card.

== Alternatives ==
In Japan, return postcards are used for similar purposes.

SASEs cannot easily be used for international mail, since senders rarely have supplies of mint foreign stamps. Instead, international reply coupons (IRCs) can be purchased at post offices, although they are no longer sold in some countries, including the United States. Users of IRCs will often, as a courtesy, also send a self-addressed envelope to save the receiver the cost and time of buying and labeling an envelope.

== See also ==
- Freepost, also called Reply paid or Business reply mail
- Envelope stuffing
