= Envelope =

Stationery item used for flat mail

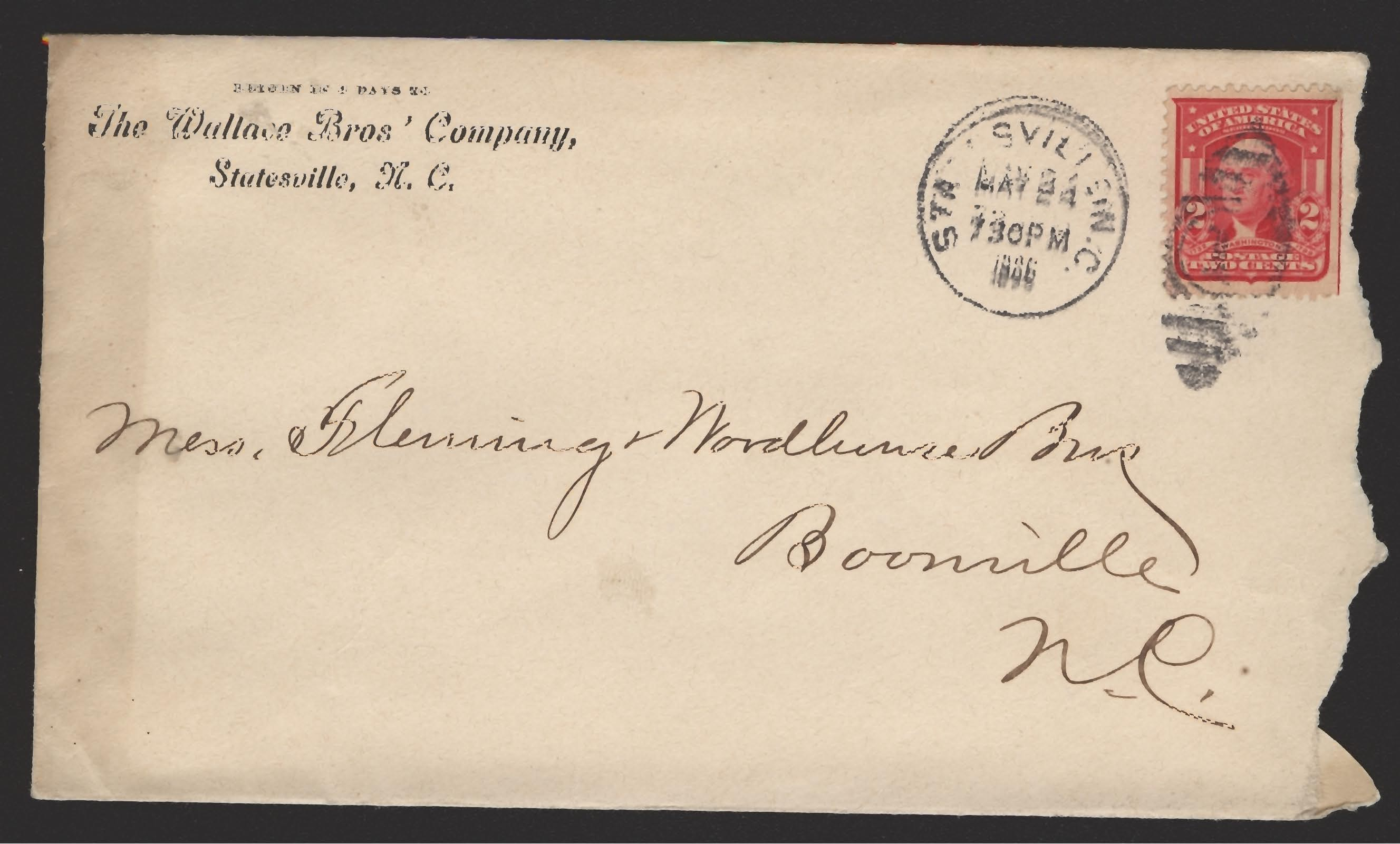
Front of an envelope mailed in the U.S. in 1906, with a postage stamp and address

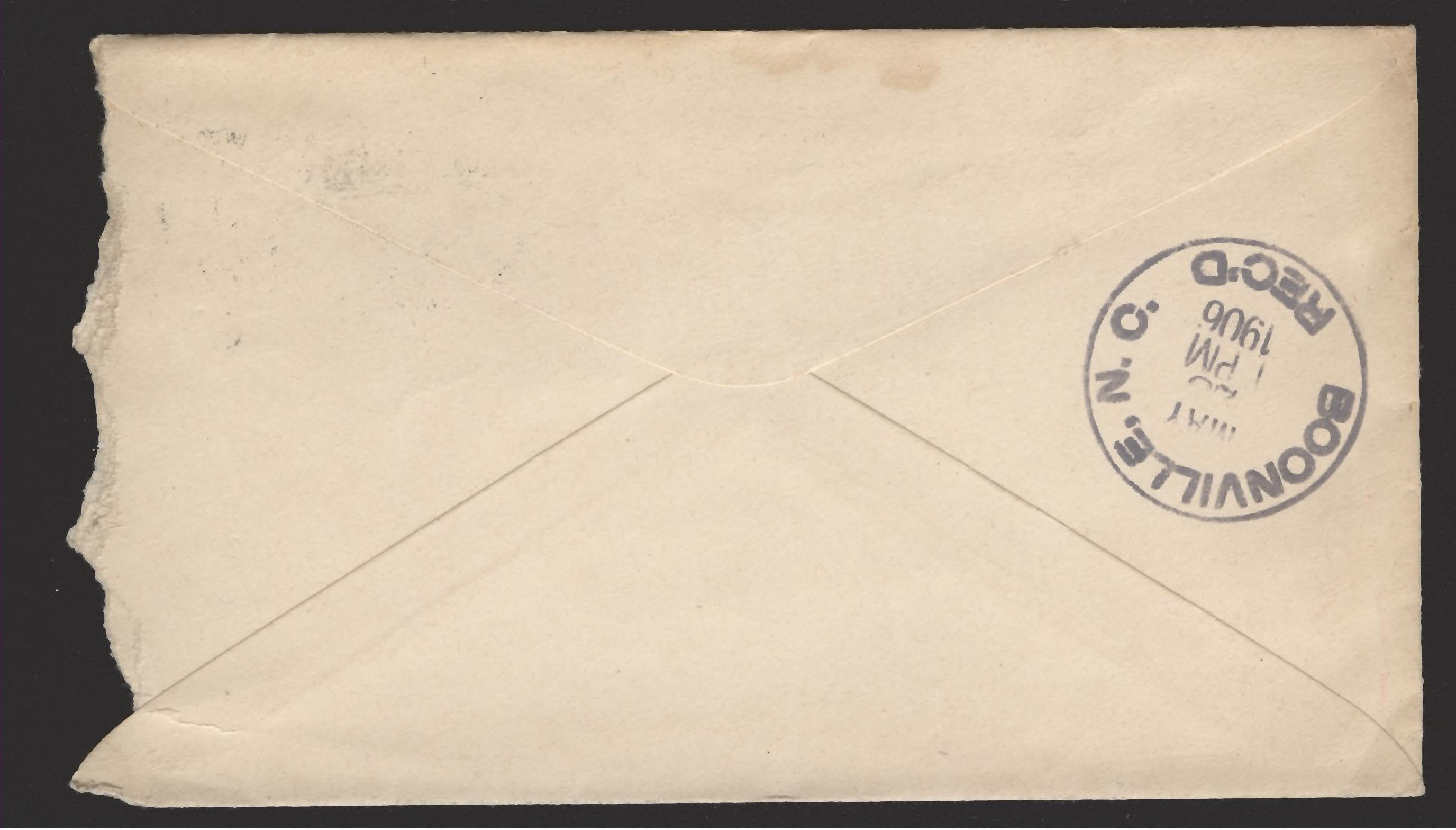
Back of the above envelope, showing an additional receiving post office postmark

An envelope is a common packaging item, usually made of thin, flat material. It is designed to contain a flat object, such as a letter or card.

Traditional envelopes are made from sheets of paper cut to one of three shapes: a rhombus, a short-arm cross or a kite. These shapes allow the envelope structure to be made by folding the sheet sides around a central rectangular area. In this manner, a rectangle-faced enclosure is formed with an arrangement of four flaps on the reverse side.

== Overview ==
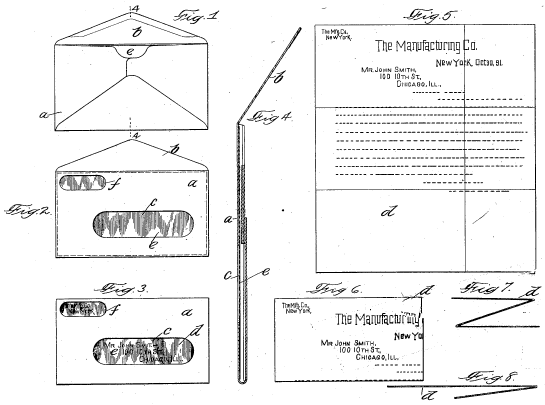
Patent drawing of Americus Callahan's windowed envelope

A folding sequence such that the last flap closed is on a short side is referred to in commercial envelope manufacture as a pocket – a format frequently employed in the packaging of small quantities of seeds. Although in principle the flaps can be held in place by securing the topmost flap at a single point (for example with a wax seal), generally they are pasted or gummed together at the overlaps. They are most commonly used for enclosing and sending mail (letters) through a prepaid-postage postal system.

Window envelopes have a hole cut in the front side that allows the paper within to be seen. They are generally arranged so that the receiving address printed on the letter is visible, saving duplication of the address on the envelope itself. The window is normally covered with a transparent or translucent film to protect the letter inside, as was first designed by Americus F. Callahan in 1901 and patented the following year. As of 2009 there is no international standard for window envelopes, but some countries, including Germany and the United Kingdom, have national standards.

An aerogram is related to a letter sheet, both being designed to have writing on the inside to minimize the weight. Any handmade envelope is effectively a letter sheet because prior to the folding stage it offers the opportunity for writing a message on that area of the sheet that after folding becomes the inside of the face of the envelope. For document security, the letter sheet can be sealed with wax. Another secure form of letter sheet is a locked letter that is formed by cutting and folding the sheet in an elaborate way that prevents the letter from being opened without creating obvious damage to the letter/envelope.

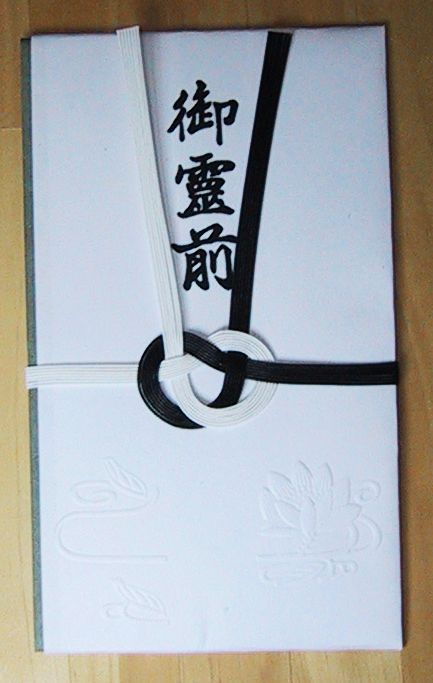
A Japanese funeral envelope used for offering condolence money. The white and black cords represent death. Similar-looking envelopes with red and silver cords are used for weddings.

The "envelope" used to launch the Penny Post component of the British postal reforms of 1840 by Sir Rowland Hill and the invention of the postage stamp was a lozenge-shaped lettersheet known as a Mulready. If desired, a separate letter could be enclosed with postage remaining at one penny provided the combined weight did not exceed half an ounce (14 grams). This was a legacy of the previous system of calculating postage, which partly depended on the number of sheets of paper used.

During the U.S. Civil War those in the Confederate States Army occasionally used envelopes made from wallpaper, due to financial hardship.

A "return envelope" is a pre-addressed, smaller envelope included as the contents of a larger envelope and can be used for courtesy reply mail, metered reply mail, or freepost (business reply mail). Some envelopes are designed to be reused as the return envelope, saving the expense of including a return envelope in the contents of the original envelope. The direct mail industry makes extensive use of return envelopes as a response mechanism.

Up until 1840, all envelopes were handmade, each being individually cut to the appropriate shape out of an individual rectangular sheet. In that year George Wilson in the United Kingdom patented the method of tessellating (tiling) a number of envelope patterns across and down a large sheet, thereby reducing the overall amount of waste produced per envelope when they were cut out. In 1845 Edwin Hill and Warren de la Rue obtained a patent for a steam-driven machine that not only cut out the envelope shapes but creased and folded them as well. (Mechanised gumming had yet to be devised.) The convenience of the sheets ready cut to shape popularized the use of machine-made envelopes, and the economic significance of the factories that had produced handmade envelopes gradually diminished.

As envelopes are made of paper, they are intrinsically amenable to embellishment with additional graphics and text over and above the necessary postal markings. This is a feature that the direct mail industry has long taken advantage of—and more recently the mail art movement. Custom printed envelopes have also become an increasingly popular marketing method for small businesses.

Since the early 20th century, mechanical folding machines have been the basis of envelope production.

== Sizes ==
=== International standard sizes ===
International standard ISO 269 (withdrawn in 2009 without replacement) defined several standard envelope sizes, which are designed for use with ISO 216 standard paper sizes:

International standard envelope sizes
Format	Dimensions (mm)	Dimensions (in)	AR	Suitable content format
DL	110 × 220	4 1/3 × 8 2/3	2∶1	1/3 A4
C7	81 × 114	3 5/24 × 4 1/2	√2∶1	A7 (or 1/2 A6)
C7/C6	81 × 162	3 5/24 × 6 3/8	2∶1	1/3 A5
C6	114 × 162	4 1/2 × 6 3/8	√2∶1	A6 (or 1/2 A5 or 1/4 A4)
C6/C5	114 × 229	4 1/2 × 9	2∶1	1/3 A4
C5	162 × 229	6 3/8 × 9	√2∶1	A5 (or 1/2 A4)
C4	229 × 324	9 × 12 3/4	√2∶1	A4
C3	324 × 458	12 3/4 × 18 1/24	√2∶1	A3
B6	125 × 176	4 11/12 × 6 11/12	√2∶1	C6
B5	176 × 250	6 11/12 × 9 5/6	√2∶1	C5
B4	250 × 353	9 5/6 × 13 11/12	√2∶1	C4
E4	280 × 400	11 1/24 × 15 3/4	10∶7	B4

The German standard DIN 678 defines a similar list of envelope formats.

DL comes from the DIN Lang (German: "Long") size envelope which originated in the 1920s.

=== North American sizes ===
There are dozens of sizes of envelopes available in the United States.

The designations such as "A2" do not correspond to ISO paper sizes. Sometimes, North American paper jobbers and printers will insert a hyphen to distinguish from ISO sizes, thus: A-2.

North American standard envelope sizes
Format	Dimensions (in)	Dimensions (mm)	AR	Suitable content format
A2 (Lady Grey)	4 3/8 × 5 3/4	111 × 146	1.31	Letter paper folded twice (4 1/4 × 5 1/2)
A6 (Thompson Standard)	4 3/4 × 6 1/2	121 × 165	1.37	A2
A7 (Besselheim)	5 1/4 × 7 1/4	133 × 184	1.38	A6
A8 (Carrs)	5 1/2 × 8 1/8	140 × 206	1.48	A7
A9 (Diplomat)	5 3/4 × 8 3/4	146 × 222	1.52	Letter paper folded once (5 1/2 × 8 1/2), A8
A10 (Willow)	6 × 9 1/2	152 × 241	1.58	
C5	6 1/2 × 9 1/2	165 × 241	1.46	
No. 6 3/4 (Personal)	3 5/8 × 6 1/2	92.1 × 165	1.79	Personal check, US currency
No. 7 3/4 (Monarch)	3 7/8 × 7 1/2	98.4 × 191	1.94	
No. 9 (A long)	3 7/8 × 8 7/8	98.4 × 225	2.29	
No. 10 (Business, Commercial)	4 1/8 × 9 1/2	105 × 241	2.3	No. 9; letter paper folded into thirds (3 2/3 × 8 1/2)
No. 11	4 1/2 × 10 3/8	114 × 264	2.31	No. 10
No. 12	4 3/4 × 11	121 × 279	2.32	No. 11
No. 14	5 × 11 1/2	127 × 292	2.3	No. 12

The No. 10 envelope is the standard business envelope size in the United States. PWG 5101.1 also lists the following even inch sizes for envelopes: 6 × 9, 7 × 9, 9 × 11, 9 × 12, 10 × 13, 10 × 14 and 10 × 15.

Envelopes accepted by the U.S. Postal Service for mailing at the price of a letter must be:

- Rectangular
- At least 3 1/2 inches high × 5 inches long × 0.007 inch thick.
- No more than 6 1/8 inches high × 11 1/2 inches long × 1/4 inch thick.
- Letters that have a length-to-height aspect ratio of less than 1.3 or more than 2.5 are classified as "non-machinable" by the USPS and may cost more to mail.

=== Chinese sizes ===
Chinese envelope sizes
Format		Dimensions (mm)	Dimensions (in)	AR	Suitable content format
PRC1	Chinese #1 Envelope	102 × 165	4 × 6 1/2	ϕ∶1	
PRC2	Chinese #2 Envelope	102 × 176	4 × 6 11/12	1.73	
PRC3, ISO B6	Chinese #3 Envelope	125 × 176	4 11/12 × 6 11/12	√2∶1	C6
PRC4	Chinese #4 Envelope	110 × 208	4 1/3 × 8 5/24	1.85∶1	
PRC6	Chinese #6 Envelope	120 × 320	4 17/24 × 12 7/12	2.67	A4 folded once (105 mm × 297 mm)
PRC7	Chinese #7 Envelope	160 × 230	6 7/24 × 9 1/24	13∶9	A5 (rounded ISO C5)
PRC8	Chinese #8 Envelope	120 × 309	4 17/24 × 12 1/6	2.58	A4 folded once (105 mm × 297 mm)
PRC10, ISO C3	Chinese #10 Envelope	324 × 458	12 3/4 × 18 1/24	√2∶1	A3

=== Japanese sizes ===
Japanese traditional rectangular (角形, kakugata, K) and long (長形, nagagata, N) envelopes open on the short side, while Western-style (洋形, yōgata, Y) envelopes open on the long side. The Japanese standard JIS S 5502 was first published in 1964. Some traditional sizes were not kept and some sizes have been removed until its latest edition in 2014, leaving behind gaps in the numeric sequence of designations.

Japanese envelopes
Format		Standard	Dimensions (mm)	Dimensions (in)	AR	Suitable content format
Kaku A3		informal	320 × 440	12 7/12 × 17 1/3	1.38	A3
Kaku 0	K0	not in PWG	287 × 382	11 7/24 × 15 1/24	4∶3	B4
Kaku 1	K1	in PWG	270 × 382	10 5/8 × 15 1/24	√2∶1	B4
Kaku 2	K2	Yes	240 × 332	9 11/24 × 13 1/12	1.38	A4
Kaku 20	K20	ISO C4	229 × 324	9 × 12 3/4	√2∶1	A4
Kaku 3	K3	Yes	216 × 277	8 1/2 × 10 11/12	32∶25	B5
Kaku 4	K4	Yes	197 × 267	7 3/4 × 10 1/2	1.36	B5
Kaku 5	K5	Yes	190 × 240	7 1/2 × 9 11/24	1.26	A5
Kaku 6	K6	ISO C5	162 × 229	6 3/8 × 9	√2∶1	A5
Kaku 7	K7	Yes	142 × 205	5 7/12 × 8 1/12	13∶9	B6
Kaku 8	K8	Yes	119 × 197	4 2/3 × 7 3/4	1.66	salaries, wages
Chou 1	N1	deprecated	142 × 332	5 7/12 × 13 1/12	2.34	A4 folded in half lengthwise
Chou 2	N2	not in PWG	119 × 277	4 2/3 × 10 11/12	2.33	B5 folded in half lengthwise
Chou 2		in PWG	111.1 × 146	4 3/8 × 5 3/4	1.31	
Chou 3	N3	Yes	120 × 235	4 17/24 × 9 1/4	1.96	A4 folded in thirds
Chou 30	N30	deprecated	92 × 235	3 5/8 × 9 1/4	2.55	A4 folded in fourths
Chou 4	N4	Yes	90 × 205	3 13/24 × 8 1/12	20½∶9	JIS B5 folded in fourths
Chou 40	N40	Yes	90 × 225	3 13/24 × 8 7/8	2.5	A4 folded in fourths
	N6	DL	110 × 220	4 1/3 × 8 2/3	2∶1	A4 folded in thirds
You 0, You 8	Y0	deprecated	136 × 197	5 3/8 × 7 3/4	1.45	kyabine (cabinet) size photos (120 mm × 165 mm)
You 1	Y1	not in PWG	120 × 176	4 17/24 × 6 11/12	1.47	C6, You 2
You 1		No	118 × 173	4 5/8 × 6 19/24	1.47	C6, You 2
You 2	Y2	ISO C6	114 × 162	4 1/2 × 6 3/8	√2∶1	A6 (105 mm × 148 mm), Hagaki
You 3	Y3	deprecated	98 × 148	3 7/8 × 5 5/6	1.51	JIS B7 (91 mm × 128 mm)
You 4 (Chou 31)	Y4	Yes	105 × 235	4 1/8 × 9 1/4	2.24	A4 folded in thirds (99 mm × 210 mm), You 5
You 5	Y5	deprecated	95 × 217	3 3/4 × 8 13/24	20½∶9	A4 folded in fourths (74 mm × 210 mm)
You 6	Y6	Yes	98 × 190	3 7/8 × 7 1/2	1.94	
You 7	Y7	deprecated	92 × 165	3 5/8 × 6 1/2	1.79	JIS B7

== Manufacture ==
=== History of envelopes ===
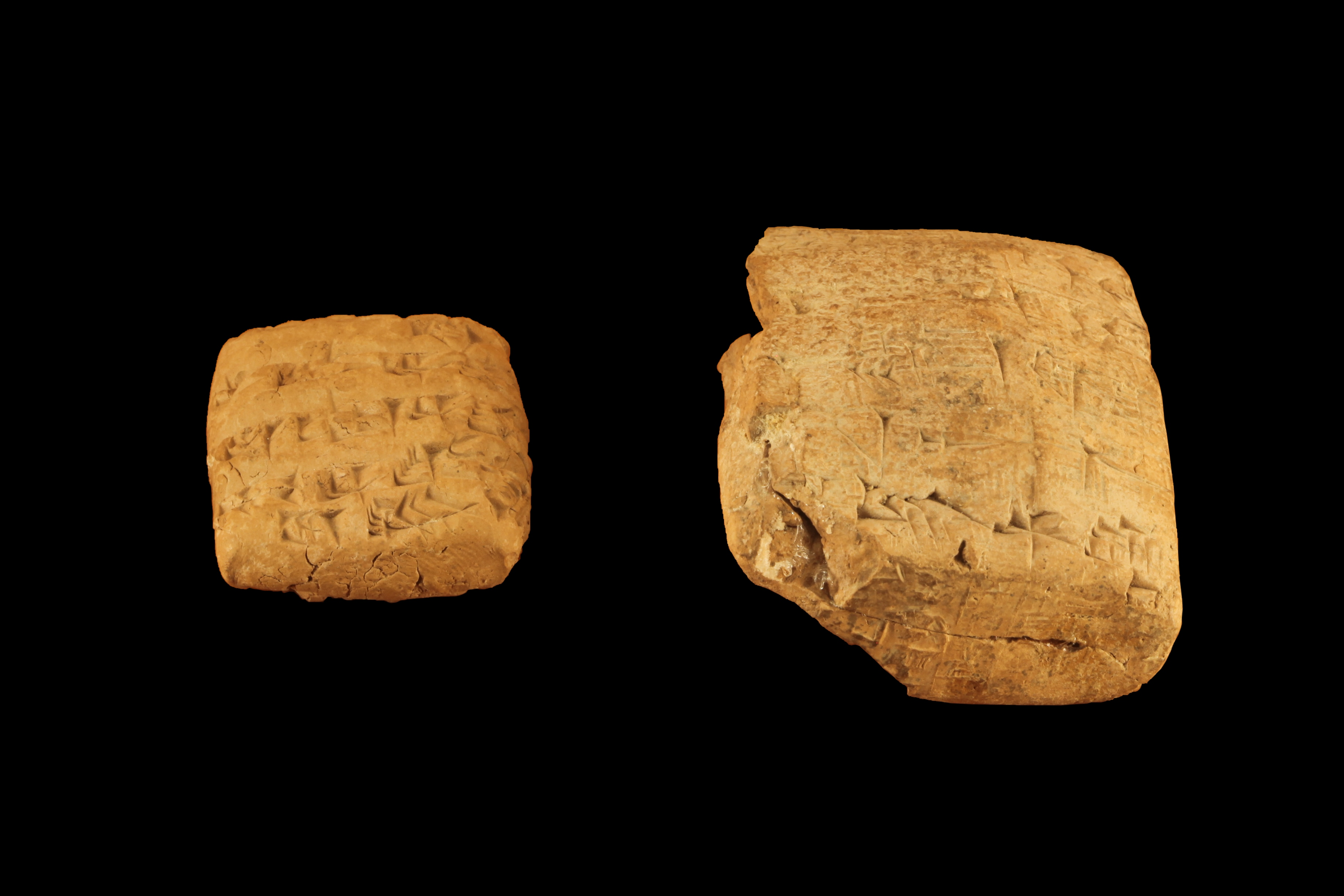
Tablet and its sealed envelope: employment contract. Girsu, Sumer, c. 2037 BC. Terra cotta. Museum of Fine Arts of Lyon.

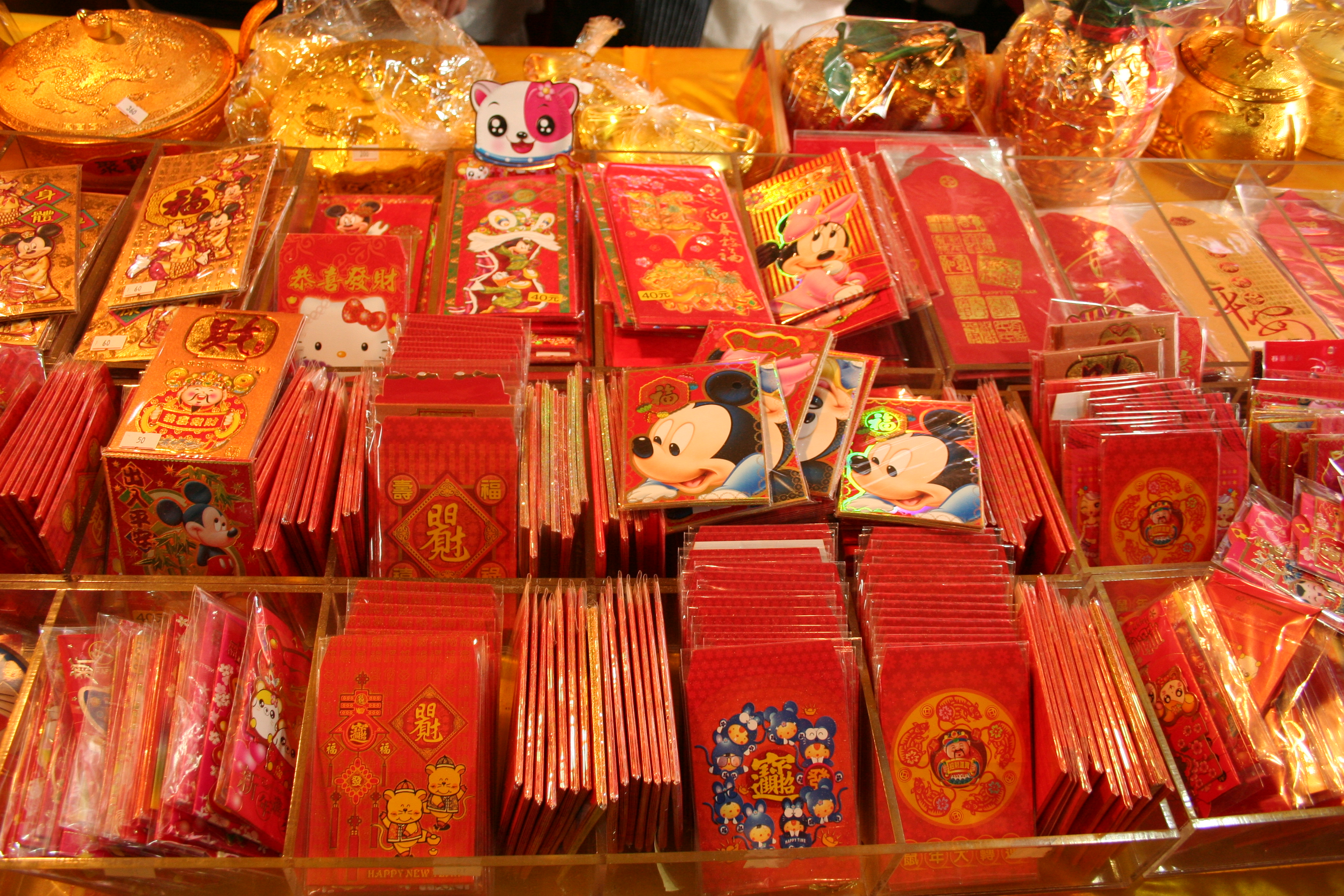
Red paper envelopes (hongbao) are often used for monetary gifts in China and Southeast Asia.

The first known envelope was nothing like the paper envelope of today. It can be dated back to around 3500 to 3200 BC in the ancient Middle East. Hollow clay spheres were molded around financial tokens and used in private transactions. The two people who discovered these first envelopes were Jacques de Morgan, in 1901, and Roland de Mecquenem, in 1907.

Paper envelopes were developed in China, where paper was invented by the 2nd century BC. Paper envelopes known as zhibao were used to store gifts of money. In the Southern Song dynasty, the Chinese imperial court used paper envelopes to distribute monetary gifts to government officials.

In Western history, from the time flexible writing material became more readily available in the 13th century (Note: The use of waterwheel power for pounding linen, cotton, and flax cloth rags into pulp for papermaking dramatically increased the availability of paper.) until the mid-19th century, correspondence was typically secured by a process of folding and sealing the letter itself, sometimes including elaborate letterlocking techniques to indicate tampering or prove authenticity. Some of these letter techniques, which could involve stitching or wax seals, were also employed to secure hand-made envelopes.

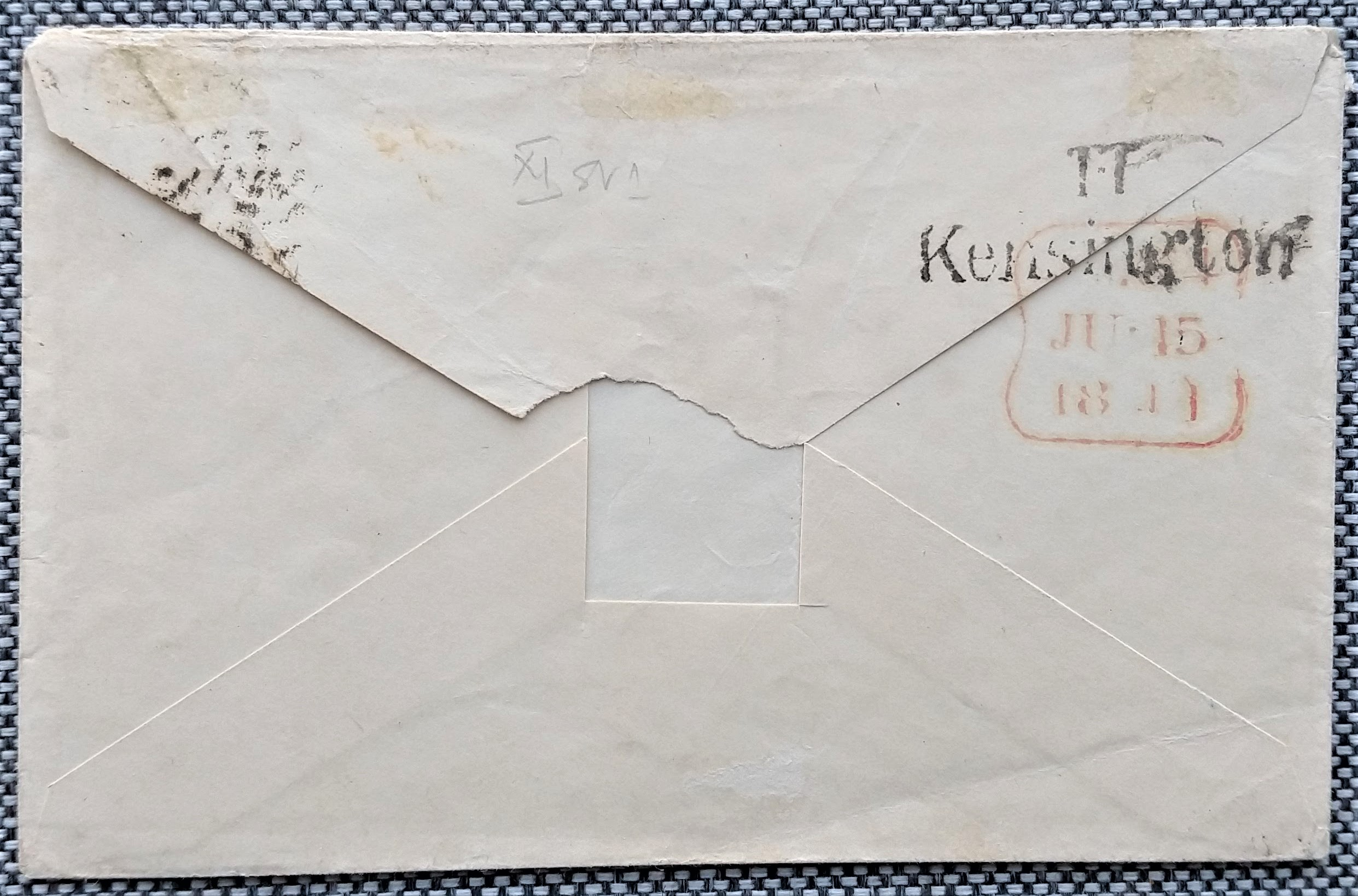
Reverse of envelope (possibly machine-cut) stamped 1841

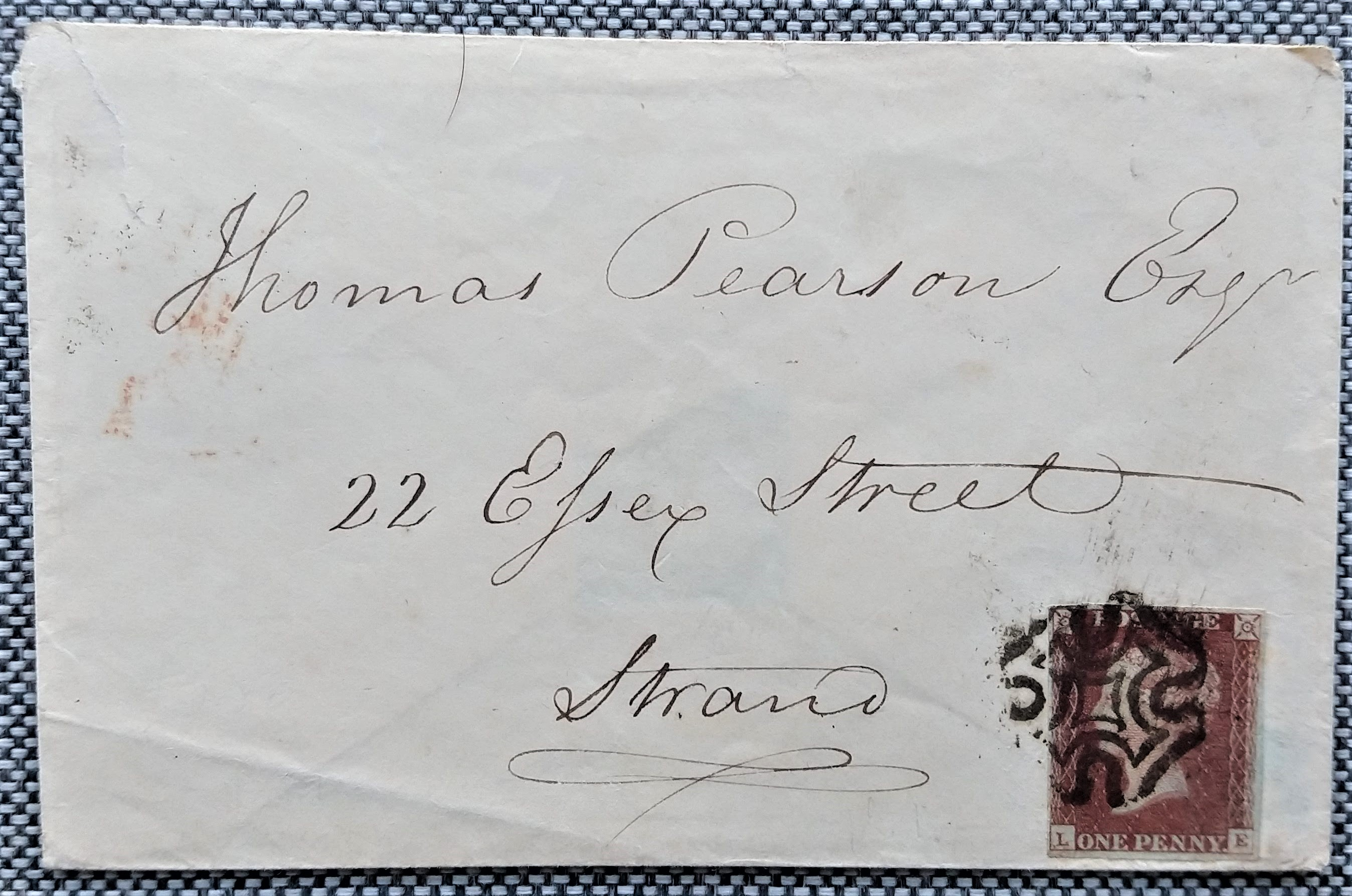
Front of an envelope mailed in 1841. Stamp from 1841 on backside. Possibly machine-cut.

Prior to 1840, all envelopes were handmade, including those for commercial use. In 1840 George Wilson of London was granted a patent for an envelope-cutting machine (patent: "an improved paper-cutting machine"); these machine-cut envelopes still needed to be folded by hand. In 1845, Edwin Hill and Warren De La Rue were granted a British patent for the first envelope-folding machine.

The "envelopes" produced by the Hill/De La Rue machine were not like those used today. They were flat diamond, lozenge (or rhombus)-shaped sheets or "blanks" that had been precut to shape before being fed to the machine for creasing and made ready for folding to form a rectangular enclosure. The edges of the overlapping flaps treated with a paste or adhesive and the method of securing the envelope or wrapper was a user choice. The symmetrical flap arrangement meant that it could be held together with a single wax seal at the apex of the topmost flap.

Self-gumming envelope-folding machines closer to those in use today were developed in the late 1860s beginning with Thomas Waymouth's machine for Berlin & Jones, and improved by the brothers Henry and Daniel Swift, whose design could gum envelopes without worker assistance.

As an alternative to simply wrapping a sheet of paper around a folded letter or an invitation and sealing the edges, the diamond shape is a tidy, paper-efficient way of producing a rectangular-faced envelope.

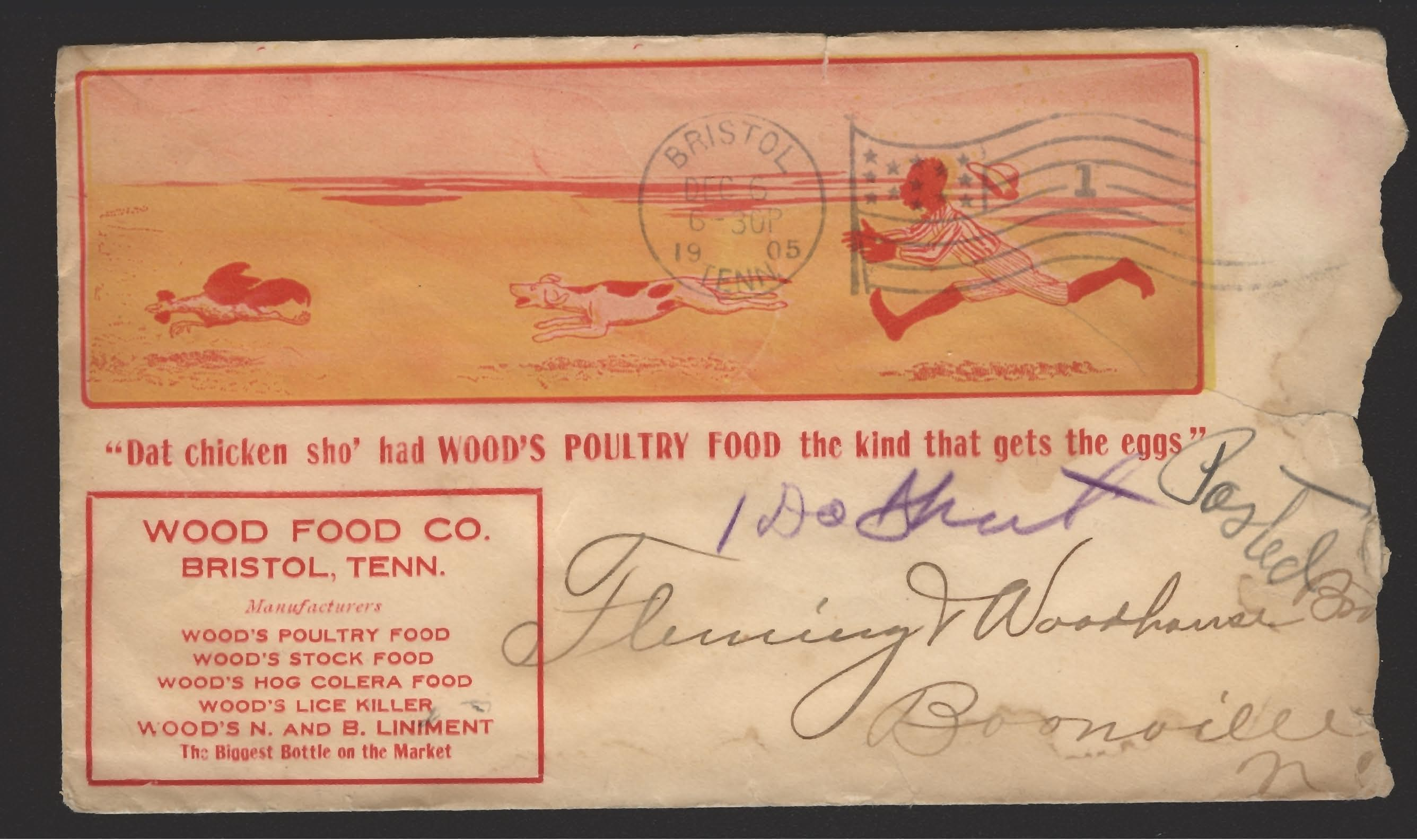
Envelope with advertising from 1905 used in the U.S.

Folded diamond-shaped sheets, whose four corners met under a single seal, were described as "new-fashioned envelopes" by the late 1830s. Their use first became widespread in the UK when the British government took monopoly control of postal services and tasked Rowland Hill with its introduction. The new service was launched in May 1840 with a postage-paid machine-printed illustrated (or pictorial) version of the wrapper and the much-celebrated first adhesive postage stamp, the Penny Black, for the production of which the Jacob Perkins printing process was used to deter counterfeiting and forgery. The wrappers were printed and sold as a sheet of 12, with cutting the purchaser's task. Known as Mulready stationery, because the illustration was created by the respected artist William Mulready, the envelopes were withdrawn when the illustration was ridiculed and lampooned. Nevertheless, the public apparently saw the convenience of the wrappers being available ready-shaped, and it must have been obvious that with the stamp available totally plain versions of the wrapper could be produced and postage prepaid by purchasing a stamp and affixing it to the wrapper once folded and secured. In this way, although the postage-prepaid pictorial version was unsuccessful, the diamond-shaped wrapper acquired de facto official status and became readily available to the public. With the issuing of the stamps and the operation and control of the service (which is a communications medium) in government hands the British model spread around the world and the diamond-shaped wrapper went with it.

Hill also installed his brother Edwin as The Controller of Stamps, and it was he with his partner Warren De La Rue who patented the machine for mass-producing the diamond-shaped sheets for conversion to envelopes in 1845. Today, envelope-making machine manufacture is a long- and well-established international industry, and blanks are produced with a short-arm-cross shape and a kite shape as well as diamond shape. (The short-arm-cross style is mostly encountered in "pocket" envelopes i.e. envelopes with the closing flap on a short side. The more common style, with the closing flap on a long side, are sometimes referred to as "standard" or "wallet" style for purposes of differentiation.)

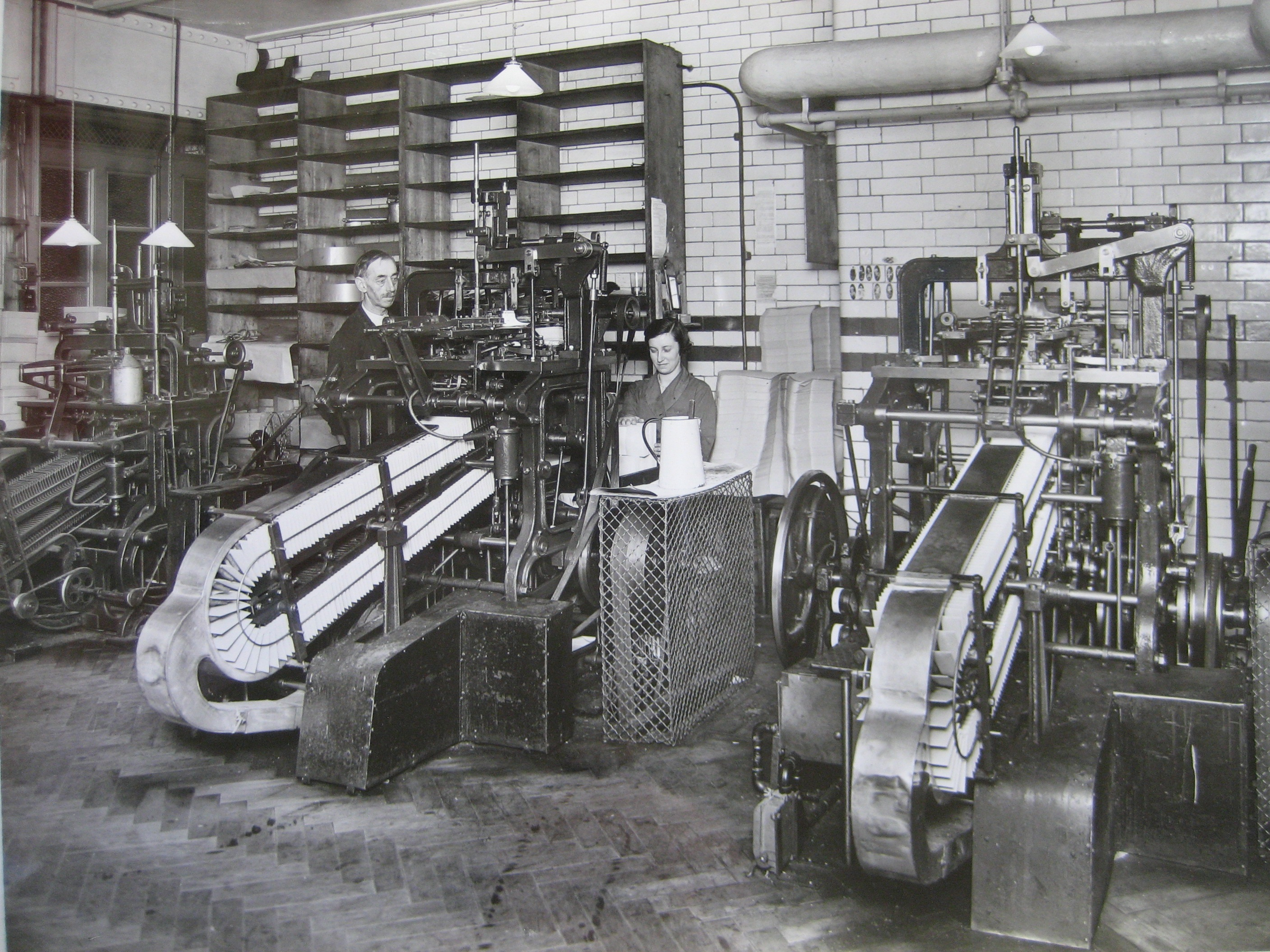
Envelope-making machines at the Post Office Savings Bank, Blythe House, West Kensington, London

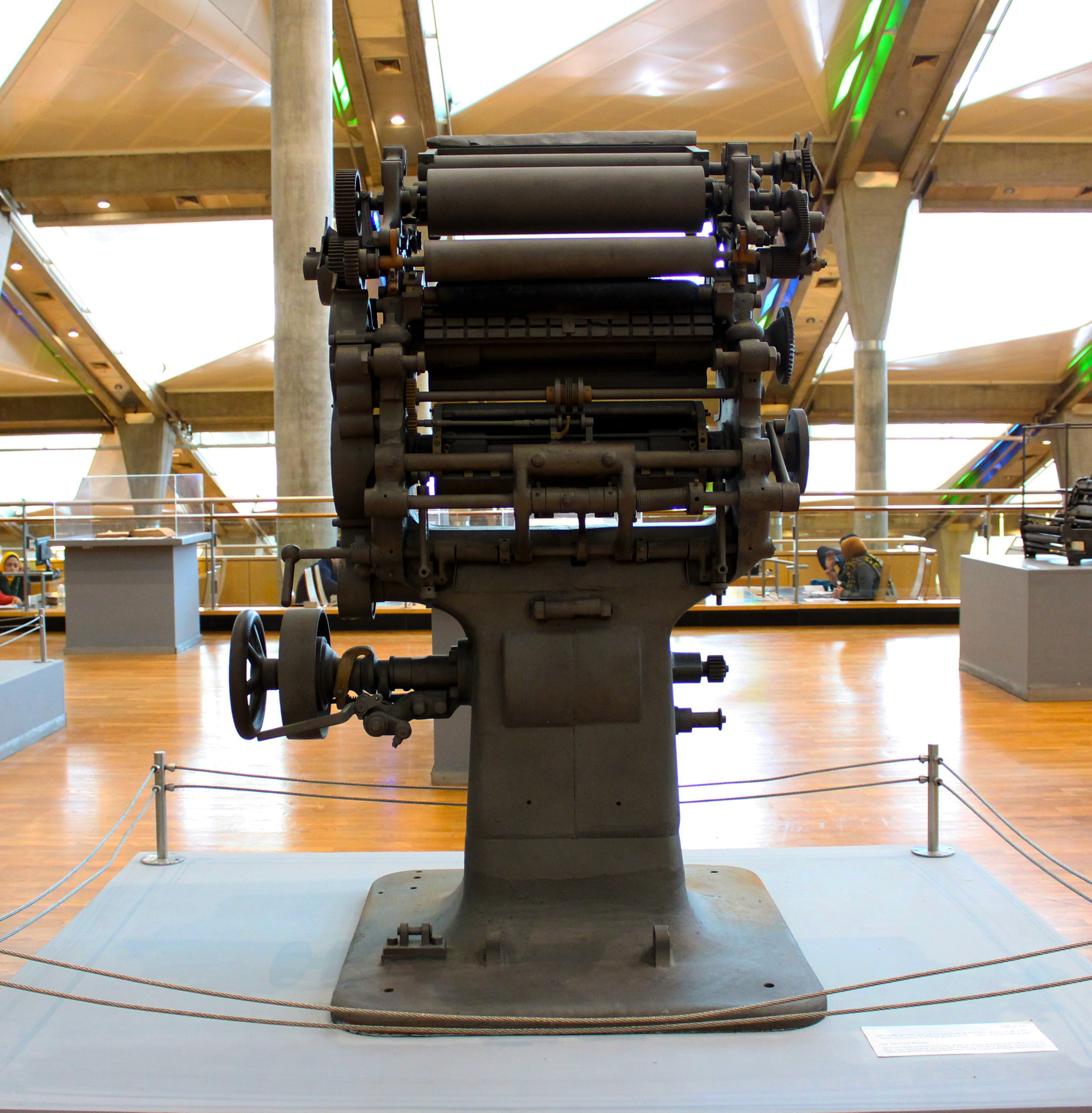
Machine Envelope Printer was one of the machine presses at the Bulaq Press. It is now in Bibliotheca Alexandrina.

The most famous paper-making machine was the Fourdrinier machine. The process involves taking processed pulp stock and converting it to a continuous web which is gathered as a reel. Subsequently, the reel is guillotined edge to edge to create a large number of properly rectangular sheets because ever since the invention of Gutenberg's press paper has been closely associated with printing.

To this day, all other mechanical printing and duplicating equipments devised in the meantime, including the typewriter (which was used up to the 1990s for addressing envelopes), have been primarily designed to process rectangular sheets. Hence the large sheets are in turn guillotined down to the sizes of rectangular sheet commonly used in the commercial printing industry, and nowadays to the sizes commonly used as feed-stock in office-grade computer printers, copiers and duplicators (mainly ISO, A4 and US Letter).

Using any mechanical printing equipment to print on envelopes, which although rectangular, are in fact folded sheets with differing thicknesses across their surfaces, calls for skill and attention on the part of the operator. In commercial printing the task of printing on machine-made envelopes is referred to as "overprinting" and is usually confined to the front of the envelope. If printing is required on all four flaps as well as the front, the process is referred to as "printing on the flat". Eye-catching illustrated envelopes or pictorial envelopes, the origins of which as an artistic genre can be attributed to the Mulready stationery – and which was printed in this way – are used extensively for direct mail. In this respect, direct mail envelopes have a shared history with propaganda envelopes (or "covers") as they are called by philatelists.

=== Present and future state of envelopes ===
In 1998, the U.S. Postal Service approved its first systems for printing computer-generated postage, known as information-based indicia. With this innovative alternative to an adhesive-backed postage stamp, businesses could more easily produce envelopes in-house, address them, and customize them with advertising information on the face.

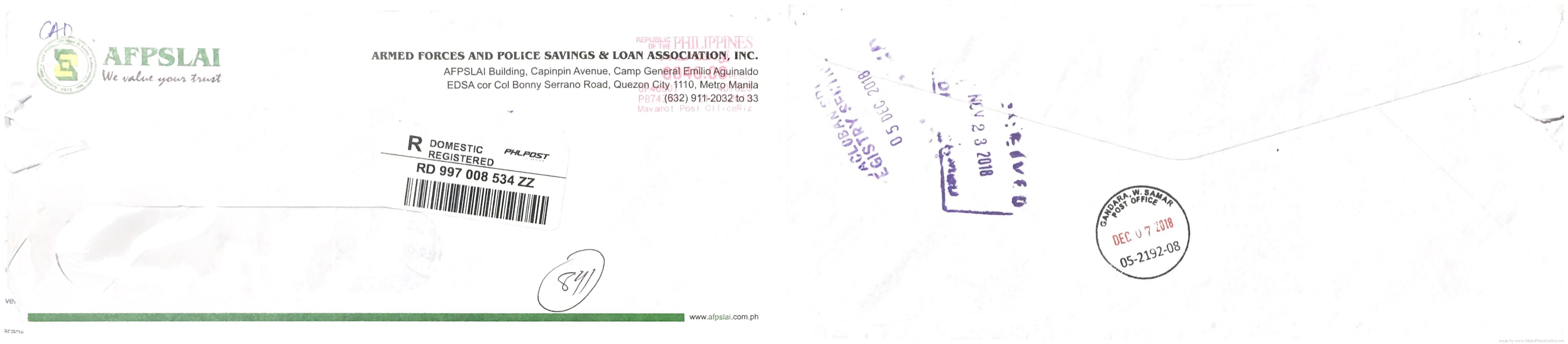
Mail envelope certified by PHLPost

The fortunes of the commercial envelope manufacturing industry and the postal service go hand in hand, and both link to the printing industry and the mechanized envelope processing industry producing equipment such as franking and addressing machines. Technological developments affecting one ricochet through the others: addressing machines print addresses, postage stamps are a print product, franking machines imprint a frank on an envelope. For example, the advent of information-based indicia (IBI) (commonly referred to as digitally-encoded electronic stamps or digital indicia) by the US Postal Service in 1998 caused widespread consternation in the franking machine industry, as their machines were rendered obsolete, and resulted in a flurry of lawsuits involving Pitney Bowes among others. The advent of e-mail in the late 1990s appeared to offer a substantial threat to the postal service. By 2008 letter-post service operators were reporting significantly smaller volumes of letter-post, specifically stamped envelopes, which they attributed mainly to e-mail. Although a corresponding reduction in the volume of envelopes required would have been expected, no such decrease was reported as widely as the reduction in letter-post volumes.

== Types of envelopes ==
=== Windowed envelopes ===
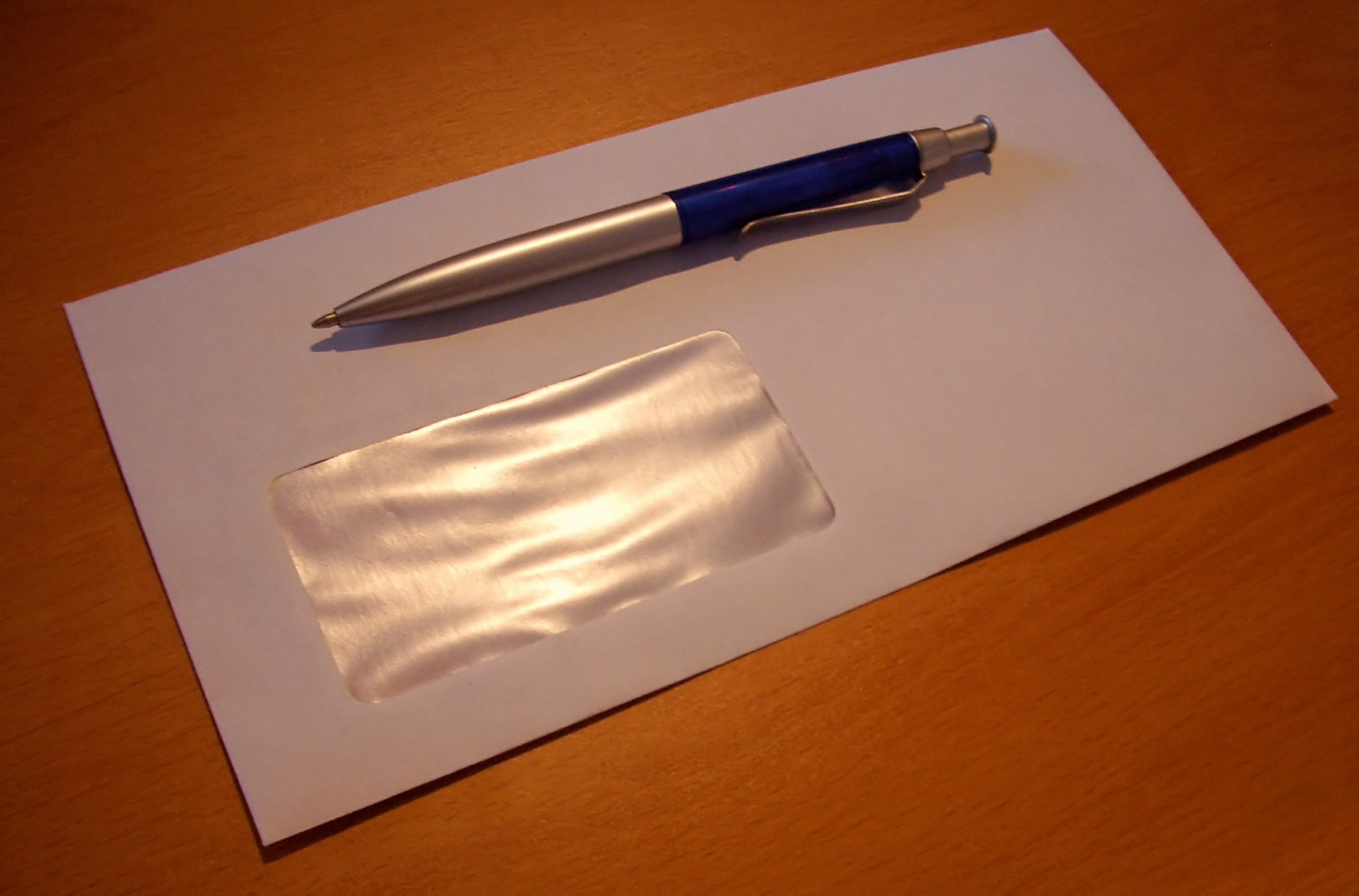
A windowed envelope

A windowed envelope is an envelope with a plastic or glassine window in it. The plastic in these envelopes creates problems in paper recycling.

=== Security envelopes ===
Security envelopes have special tamper-resistant and tamper-evident features. They are used for high value products, private documents that contain personally identifiable information, as well as for evidence for legal proceedings. Prior to envelopes, a technique called letterlocking was often used to secure correspondence.

Some security envelopes have a pattern printed on the inside, which makes it difficult to read the contents. This is called, "tinting" according to the Envelope Manufacturers Association. Various tinting patterns exist. A number of artists have incorporated security envelope designs into their work, such as:

- Elizabeth Duffy
- Joseph King
- Jürgen Mayer H.
- Sarah Nicole Phillips
- Dan Schreck
- Erica Van Horn & Harry Gilonis
- Amber Williams

=== Mailers ===
Some envelopes are available for full-size documents or for other items. Some carriers have large mailing envelopes for their express services. Other similar envelopes are available at stationery supply locations.

These mailers usually have an opening on an end with a flap that can be attached by gummed adhesive, integral pressure-sensitive adhesive, adhesive tape, or security tape. Construction is usually:

- Paperboard
- Corrugated fiberboard
- Polyethylene, often a coextrusion
- Nonwoven fabric
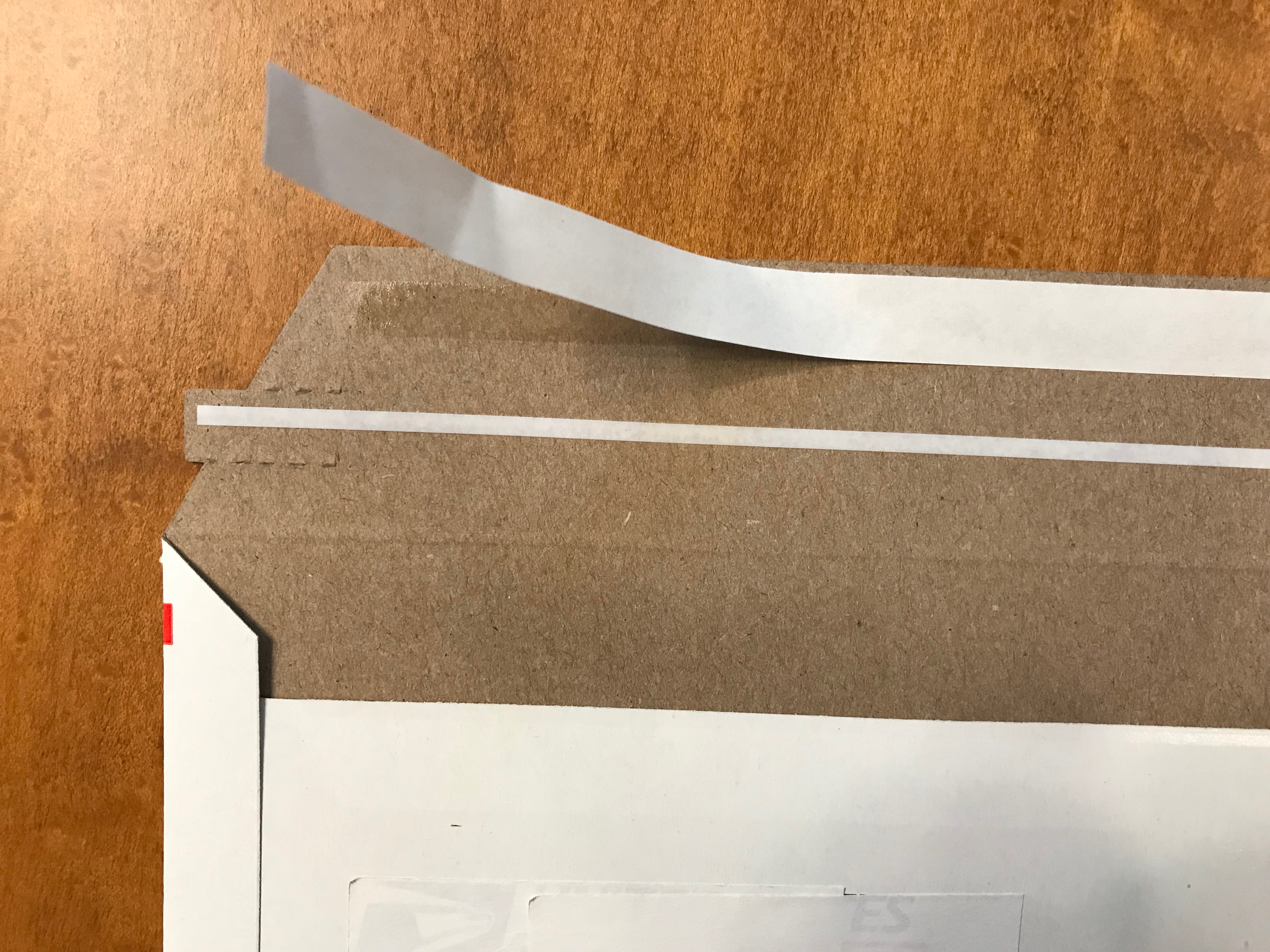
Paperboard mailing envelope showing PSA adhesive with release liner and with tear tape

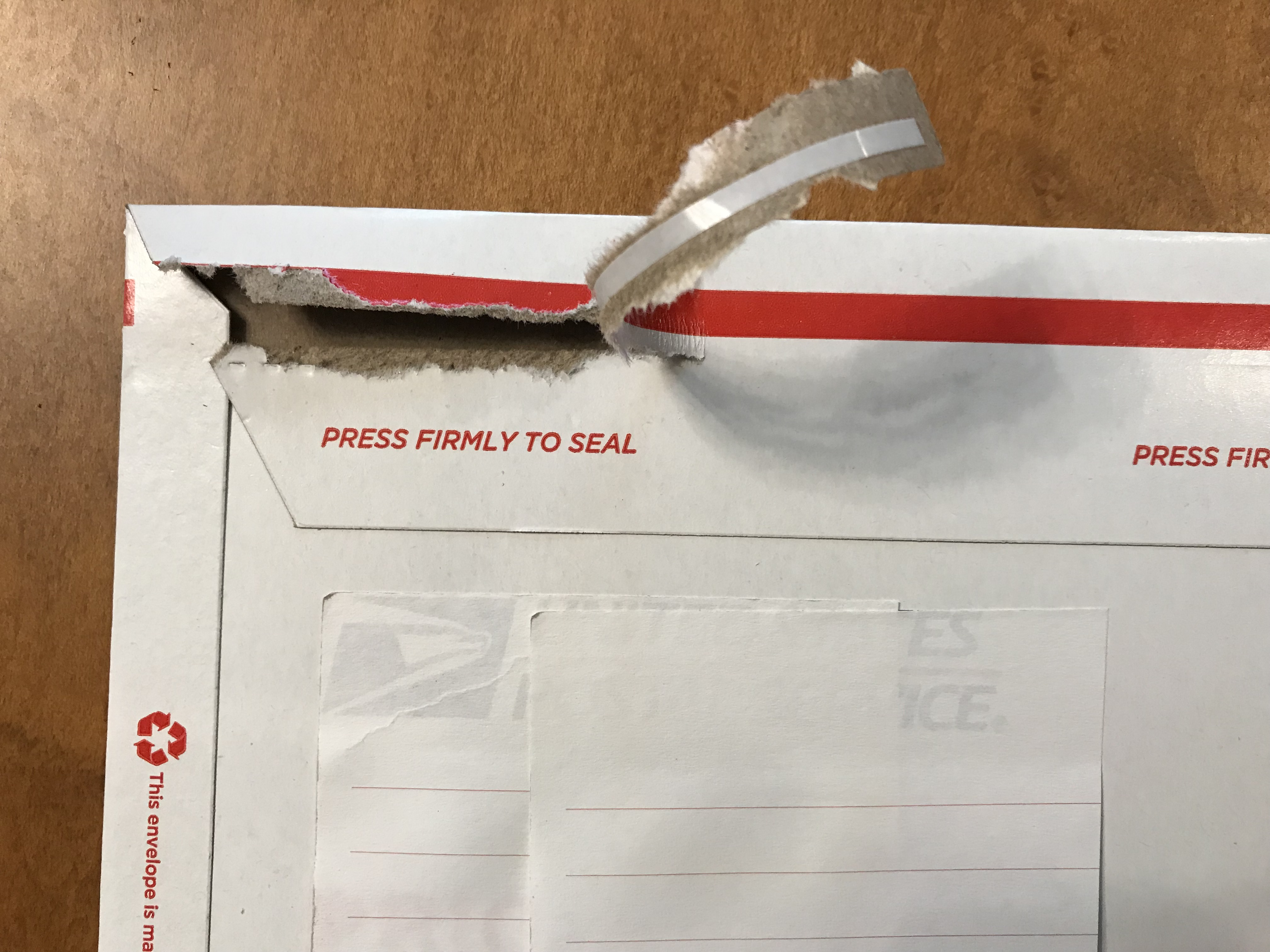
Closed mailer being opened by pulling tear tape

==== Padded mailers ====
Shipping envelopes can have padding to provide stiffness and some degree of cushioning. The padding can be ground newsprint, plastic foam sheets, or bubble packing.

=== Inter-office envelopes ===
Various U.S. Federal Government offices use Standard Form (SF) 65 Government Messenger Envelopes for inter-office mail delivery. These envelopes are typically light brown in color and un-sealed with string-tied closure method and an array of holes throughout both sides such that it is somewhat visible what the envelope contains. Other colloquial names for this envelope include "Holey Joe" and "Shotgun" envelope due to the holey nature of the envelope. Address method is unique in that these envelopes are re-usable and the previous address is crossed out thoroughly and the new addressee (name, building, room, and mailstop) is written in the next available box. Although still in use, SF-65 is no longer listed on the United States Office of Personnel Management website list of standard forms.

== See also ==
- Back-of-the-envelope calculation
- Green envelope, a Malay custom
- Red envelope, a Chinese custom
- Mourning stationery
- Return address
- Secrecy of correspondence
