= McInroy Collection =

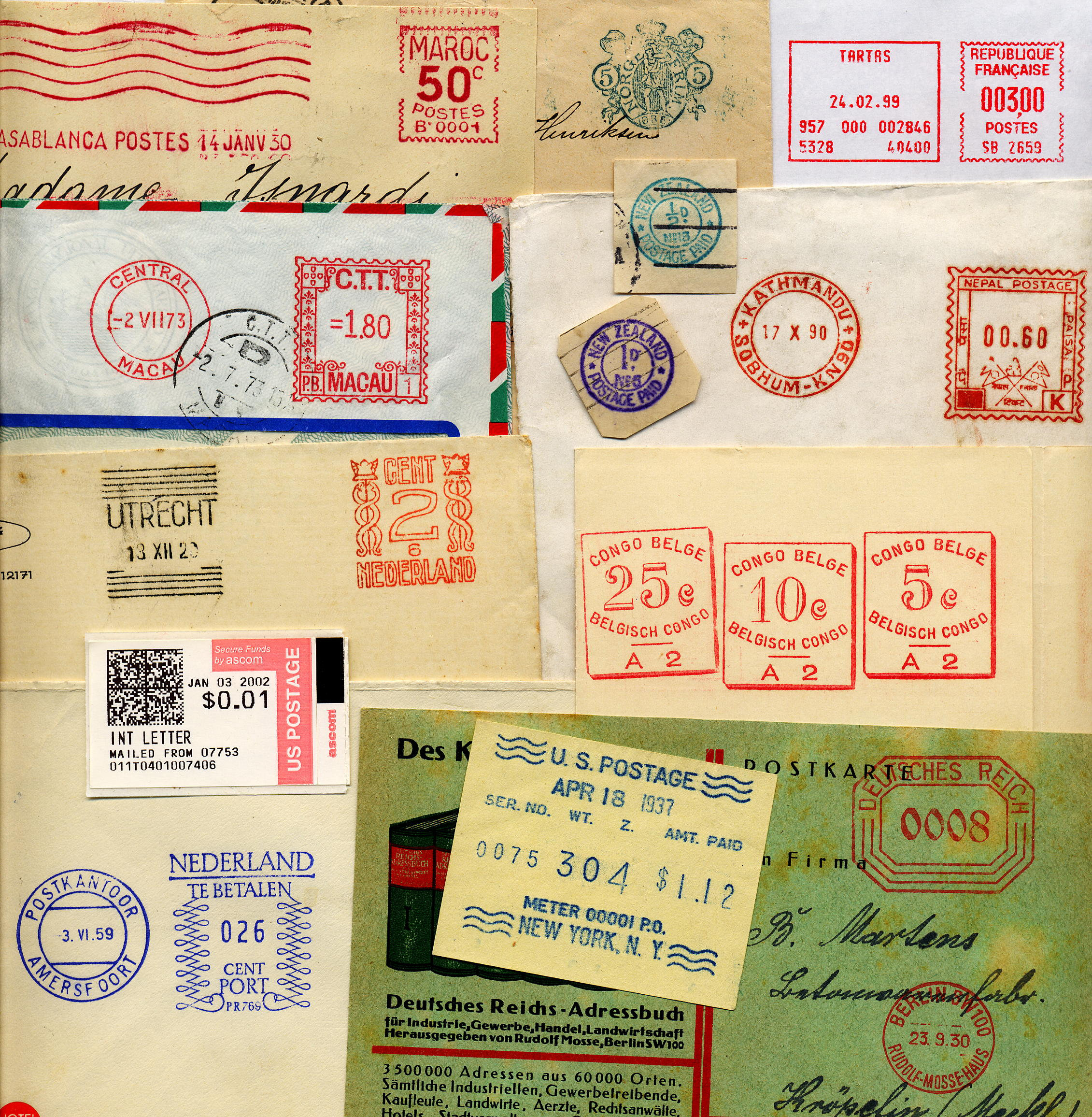
A selection of meter stamps (not from the McInroy Collection).

The McInroy Collection is a collection of meter stamps of Great Britain and the world up to 2003 that forms part of the British Library Philatelic Collections. It was formed by Dr R. McInroy and donated to the Library in 2004. As of March 2007 it comprised 116 boxes of material but with much duplication.
