= Indicia (publishing) =

Text in a magazine or comic book containing publication information

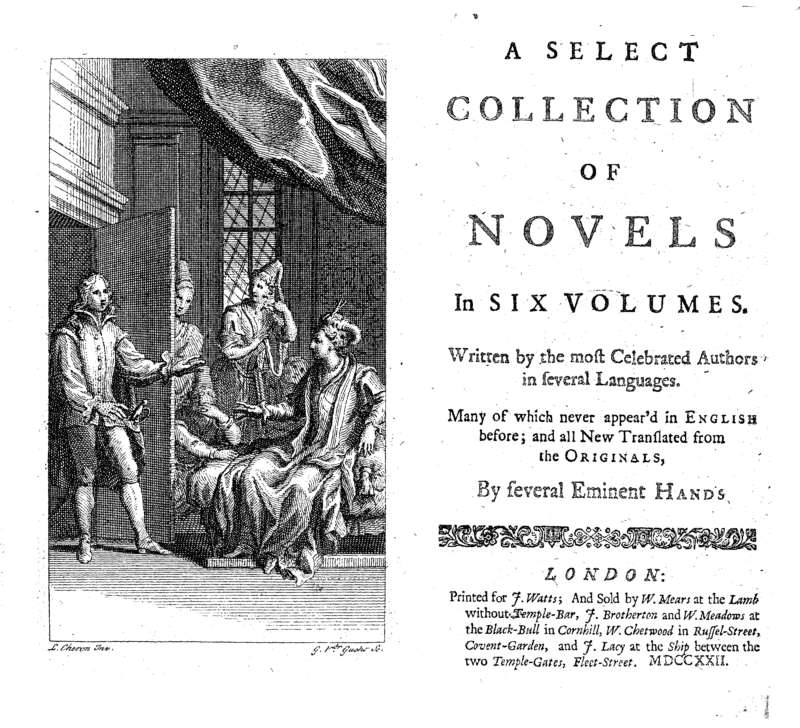
Title page of a Select Collection of novels, 1722

Indicia, from the plural of the Latin word indicium meaning distinguishing marks, is a piece of text in a magazine or comic book, traditionally appearing on the first recto page after the cover, which usually contains the official name of the publication, its publication date, issue number, information regarding editorial governance of the publication, and a disclaimer regarding disposition of unsolicited submissions. In the publishing trade it is often referred to as the flannel panel.

== Location ==
While placement of indicia was generally at the bottom of the inside first recto page, it was also found at the bottom of the inside front cover. Since 2006, American comic books commonly have indicia on the inside last verso page, while magazines may place their indicia almost anywhere within the publication (often on whichever page has the table of contents).

== See also ==
- Indicia (philately)
- Colophon
- Front matter
- Masthead (American publishing)
