= Indicia (philately) =

Marking on a mail piece showing that postage has been prepaid

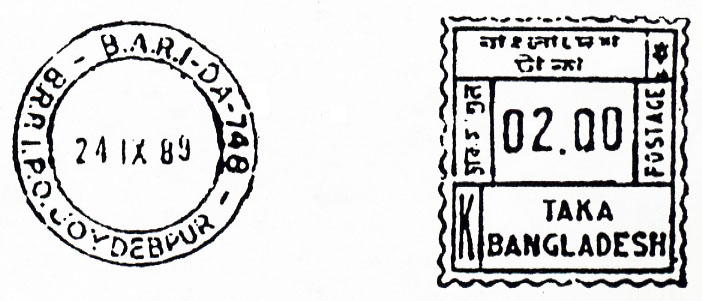
A Bangladeshi meter stamp which includes the indicium portion at right

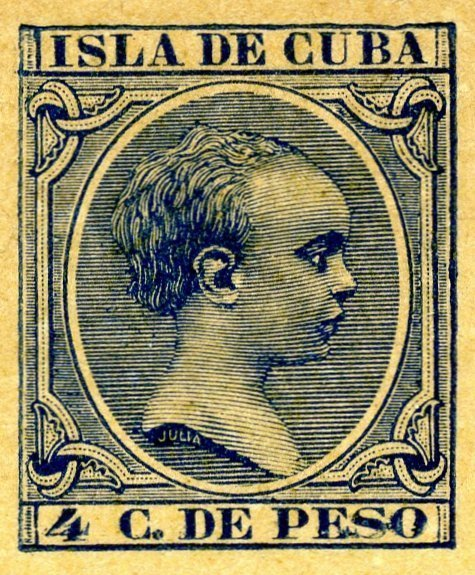
An indicium from an 1894 Cuban postal card depicting Alfonso XIII at age 5

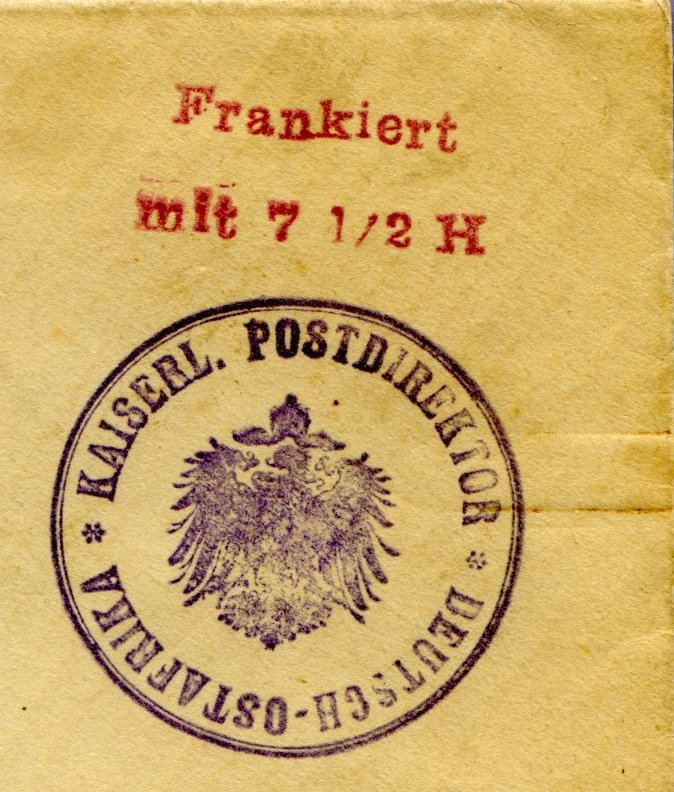
A handstamp indicium from German East Africa indicating prepayment of postage. A scarcity of postage stamps in WWI caused postal authorities to handstamp "Frankiert mit 7½ H" (plus a seal from the director of posts) on envelopes brought in by the public.

In philately, indicia are markings on a mail piece (as opposed to an adhesive stamp) showing that postage has been prepaid by the sender. Indicia is the plural of the Latin word indicium, meaning distinguishing marks, signs or identifying marks. The term imprinted stamp is used more or less interchangeably, but some indicia are not imprinted stamps. One example is the handstamp, which can be seen in a photo on this page.

== Forms of indicia ==
Indicia can take a number of forms, including printed designs or handstamps where a stamp would normally be that indicate the pre-payment of postage. Imprinted stamps on postal stationery are indicia.

The term also refers to a meter stamp impression or the part thereof that indicates the value or postal rate.

== See also ==
- Indicia (publishing)
- Information Based Indicia
- Postmark
