= Information-Based Indicia =

USPS postage evidencing standard

Information-Based Indicia (IBI) is a secure postage evidencing standard used by the United States Postal Service (USPS) to indicate electronic postage payment.

Information-Based Indicia is a two-dimensional PDF417 or data matrix barcode combined with human-readable information. The barcode data contains such information as amount of postage, origin zip code, destination, mail class, weight, confirmation/tracking numbers, and a cryptographic signature. The human-readable information shows at a minimum the information required by the USPS Domestic Mail Manual (DMM).
