= Musée de La Poste =

French postal service museum, Paris

La Poste's Museum
- Musée de La Poste

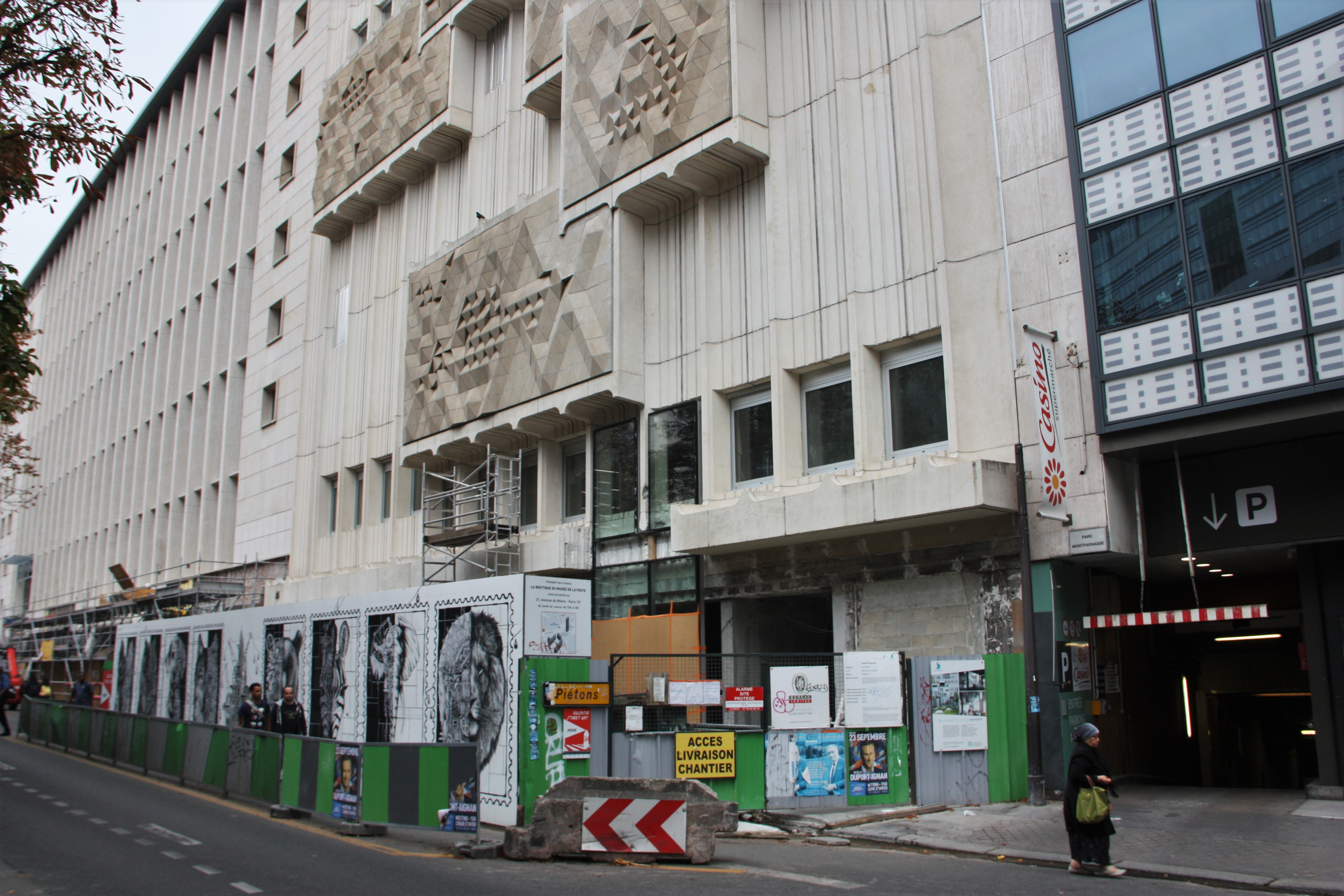
- Facade of the building
- Founded: 1946
- Founder: Eugène Vaillé
- Type: Postal Museum
- Purpose: Postal history
- Location: Paris, France
- Website: https://www.museedelaposte.fr/en

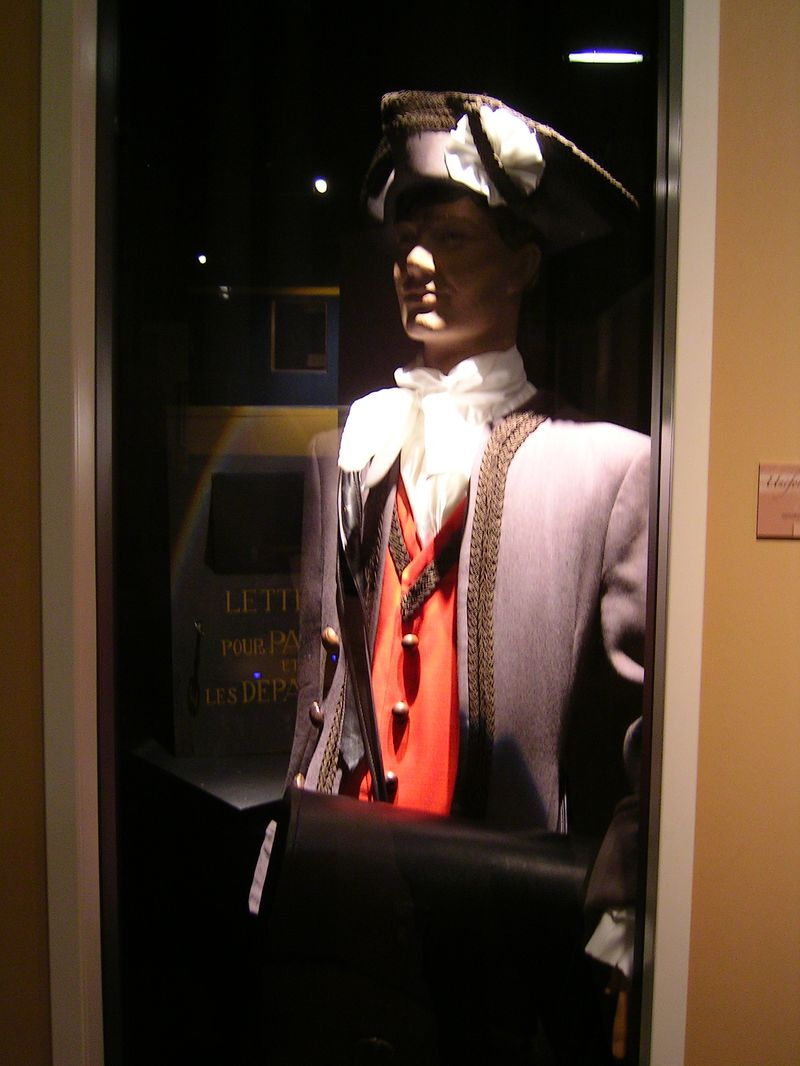
The uniform of an 18th-century French postman

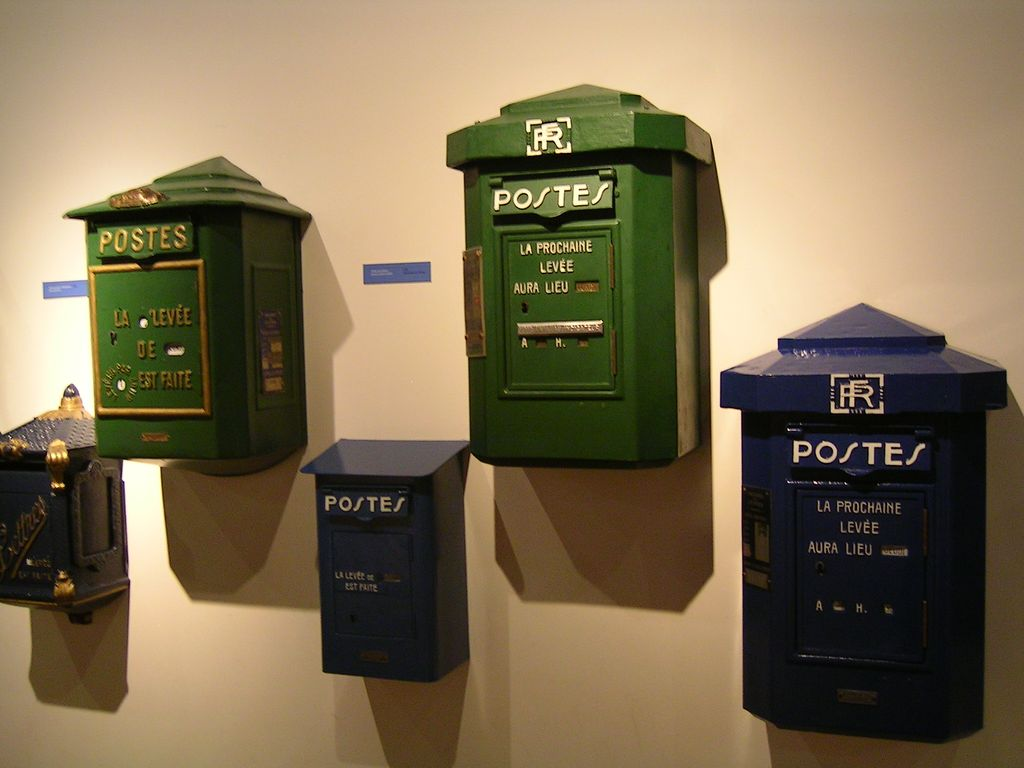
Exhibition of French post boxes

The Musée de La Poste (French pronunciation: [myze də la pɔst], La Poste's Museum) is the museum of the French postal operator La Poste. It specialises in the postal history and philately of France. Opened in 1946, the museum has been located on two sites in Paris. The museum was closed for redevelopment from 2014 to November 2019.

== Genesis ==
The idea of a postal museum was first published by philatelist Arthur Maury after scale models of postal rail transportation were exhibited at the Exposition Universelle of 1889 in Paris. Projects were written at the beginning of the 20th century, but nothing concrete was done.

In 1936, Eugène Vaillé, a civil servant at the French posts' library, convinced Minister of Posts, Telegraphs and Telephones Georges Mandel to relaunch the project. By 1937, establishment in the Choiseul-Praslin hôtel was studied. Although the economic crisis of the 1930s and World War II prevented any actual opening, a semi-postal stamp was issued on 6 July 1939, and a ruling council was instituted in 1943 with Vaillé as president. After the war, finance and an inventory by Vaillé of the postal archives permitted the inauguration in 1946.

The Musée postal de France (Postal Museum of France) opened on 4 June 1946 at the Choiseul-Praslin hôtel, in the 6th arrondissement of Paris. Its first collections were exhibited on 600 square metres and postage stamps constituted the main part. To help in managing the museum, an association was founded in 1947: the Société des amis du musée de La Poste.

Not large enough, the Choiseul-Praslin hôtel was replaced by a new building of 1,500 square meters. It was built between 1969, and 1972 and was decorated with a front wall designed by André Chatelin. The building is located near the Montparnasse station, in the 15th arrondissement of Paris. The inauguration took place on 18 December 1973.

== Collections and activities ==
Permanent exhibitions present objects connected with correspondence, transport of the mail, work of the postmen and philatelic and marcophilic items. In 1999, a room was created to exhibit the 3,500 postage stamps of France in chronological and topical order.

Temporary exhibitions on the same topics take place regularly on the ground floor of the museum.

In the upper offices, a philatelic library is available to the public, partly constituted by a loan from the Académie de philatélie.

In the entrance, a philatelic counter plays the role of post office, with cancellations inspired by temporary exhibitions.

== See also ==
- List of museums in Paris
- Postal Museum

== Sources and references ==
- Martin Hella (December 2006). "Du Musée postal de France au musée de La Poste » (From the Postal Museum of France to La Poste's Museum). L'Écho de la timbrologie #1802, pp. 38–42.
