= Postage stamps and postal history of Mayotte =

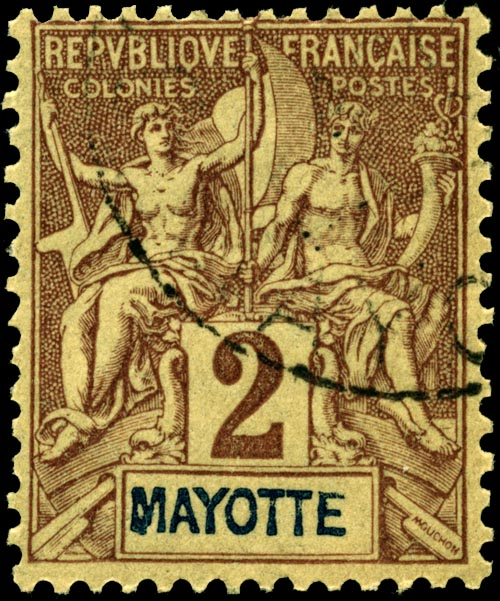
Navigation and Commerce stamp, the first Mayotte issue, 1892

This is an overview of the postage stamps and postal history of the Indian Ocean island of Mayotte, one of the Comoros Archipelago islands located on the south-east side of Africa.

Mayotte was the first Comorian island to fall under French influence at the beginning of the 1840s. It was the French administrative and postal center in the archipelago. Between 1911 and 1975, Mayotte's postal history is the same as the other Comoros: part of the Madagascar colony, then part of the Comoros Archipelago overseas territory.

In July 1975, Mayotte's postal history diverged again because its inhabitants voted by referendum to remain a French territory. After a shortage of stamps, stamps of France were used from February 1976 to December 1996.

From 1 January 1997 to 31 December 2011, Mayotte was postally autonomous and issued its own stamps. Postal operations are managed by an overseas subsidiary of La Poste.

From 1 January 2012, with the full integration of Mayotte with France, the island has no longer postal autonomy and uses the stamps of France exclusively.

== Centre of the French postal system in the Comoros ==
Mayotte became a French colony when commandant Passot bought the island from sultan Andriantsouli, at the beginning of the 1840s. Few letters posted before 1900 in Mayotte or the Comoros are known: the oldest came from Mayotte in December 1850 and do not bear a postage stamp.

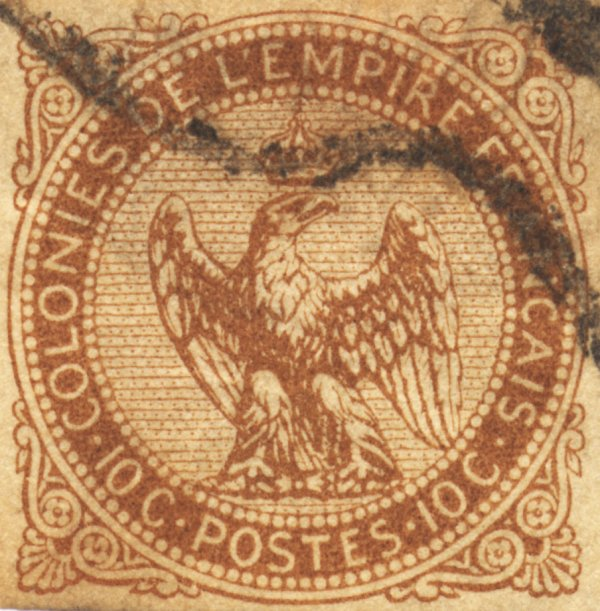
Imperial Eagle stamp, used in all French colonies

The first stamps from the Imperial Eagle series, common to all French colonies, were sent late 1861-start 1862. They were dispatched between Mayotte and Nosy Be, a northern Madagascan island. The oldest known stamped letter from Mayotte is dated December 1863.

The next shipments of stamps were dispatched from Mayotte to the three other Comorian islands when they fell under French influence. At this time, "Mayotte et dépendances" (Mayotte and dependencies) was written on the date stamp where the letters originated; only the sender's address or the correspondence point to the real origin. Moreover, until the 1870s, the cancellation is a rhombus of points with a hole in the middle; it is impossible to determine where a stamp was used but removed.

In the 1890s, like other French colonies, new stamps were designed to include the colony's name: the post office was victim of speculation between low-valued currency colonies and high-valued currency colonies. Mayotte received its stamps in November 1892.

== Part of Madagascar colony and of the Comoros Archipelago ==
Like the other Comoros and some colonies around Madagascar, Mayotte was administratively included in the latter colony in 1911. In 1912, all Mayotte's remaining stamps were overprinted to serve as 5 and 10 centimes stamps.

During the Madagascar period, a 1942 stamp commemorated the centenary of Mayotte's and Nosy Be's joining with France, with portraits of de Hell, Jéhenne and Passot.

Later, starting 15 May 1950, the stamps of the "Archipel des Comores" (Archipelago of the Comoros) are used in Mayotte, like the CFA franc. Eight stamps of this period directly concerned Mayotte: the place of the first radio transmitter of the Comoros (1960 stamp), cannon battery of Dzaoudzi in a 1966 series about military fortifications, three landscapes in 1974 (Moya beach, Chiconi and Mamoudzou), and maps on stamps by Pierre Béquet in 1971 and 1974.

== Since the Comorian independence of 1975 ==
=== Stamp shortage (1976) ===
In 1974, referendums occurred in the four Comorian islands regarding their inhabitants' wish for independence. The "no" vote won in Mayotte and France decided to treat the island separately. The Comorian parliament voted for independence on 5 July 1975, while the representatives of Mayotte did not vote for independence.

From a postal point of view, the problem is that the postage stamp stocks are in Moroni, on Grande Comore, and they were quickly overprinted to strike out all reference to French sovereignty.

In Mayotte, there was a stamp shortage as of December 1975. Until the new stamps arrived from Metropolitan France, the préfet authorized the use of cut stamps on mail. The goal was to have enough 50 CFA franc stamps for simple letters to France.

Stamps of 100 francs were cut in two, stamps of 200 francs in four. They were overprinted "Administration provisoire de Mayotte" (provisional administration of Mayotte). Four stamps were cut (in chronological order):

- 200 francs "Angraecum eburneum" of 1969,
- 100 francs "Hansen 1841–1912" of 1973,
- 200 francs "Pablo Picasso 1881–1973" of 1973,
- and 200 francs "Saïd Omar ben Soumeth, great mufti of the Comoros" issued 1974.

The 20 francs stamps about "Artcraft - bracelet" of 1975 were cut in two to help complete two stamps of 20 francs.

Stamp catalogues gave a high price to these stamps (150 euros minimum in Dallay 2006–2007), the stamp must be on cover and cancelled during the shortage period that ended with the arrival of French stamps and the introduction of the French franc.

=== Use of French stamps (1976–1996) ===
In February 1976, stamps identical to those used in Metropolitan France arrived. Like in the Réunion in January 1975, the French franc replaced the CFA franc through the Institut d'émission d'Outre-Mer, the CFP franc issuing bank.

Only the date stamp distinguished a stamp used in Mayotte.

=== Philatelic autonomy (1997–2011) ===
The post in Mayotte is operated by an overseas section of La Poste.

On 2 January 1997, the island obtained a philatelic autonomy: local institutions can choose the stamps' topics: coat of arms, artworks, traditions, fauna and flora are omnipresent. They continue to be printed by the French postal printer, Philaposte Boulazac, formerly Imprimerie des timbres-poste et valeurs fiduciaires (ITVF), whose name appears at the bottom of the stamps.

Stamps of France were no longer accepted from 31 March 1997, but the Marianne definitive series is overprinted "Mayotte". In 2001, a second definitive series completed Marianne: a black and white map of the island. Another proximity with Metropolitan stamps was the double denomination in franc and euro between July 1999 and December 2001.

The last stamp of Mayotte was a joint emission with the TAAF. From 2 January 2012, the stamps of France became valid in Mayotte, and from 1 April 2012 were the only ones on sale on Mayotte's post offices. The stamps of Mayotte remains valid without time limitation.

== Timeline ==
Years	Used stamps
1850?–1861?	None
1861?–1892	General Colonies stamps
1892–1912	Mayotte
1912–1950	Madagascar
1950–1975	Archipel des Comores
1975–1996	France
1997–2011	Mayotte
2012-....	France
Legend
	Supposed date or first known date.

== See also ==
- Postage stamps and postal history of the Comoros
- Postage stamps and postal history of Madagascar

== References and sources ==
=== Sources ===
- Philatelic section of the Comores-online.com website
- Catalogue de cotations des timbres des DOM-TOM, Dallay, 2006–2007, pp. 358–413.
