= Vitalyos =

Vitalyos or Vitályos is a surname. Notable people with the surname include:

- Adalbert Vitalyos (1914–2000), Hungarian-French journalist
- Eszter Vitályos (born 1979), Hungarian politician
