= Postage stamps and postal history of the Comoros =

The postage stamps and postal history of the Comoro Islands is an overview of the postage stamps and postal history of the Comoro Islands, an Indian Ocean archipelago located on the south-east side of Africa.

The postal service was linked to France during the colonization, who began in Mayotte in the 1840s. Successively, Mayotte's inhabitants and of Anjouan, Grande Comore et Mohéli used stamps specific to each of these islands. In 1912, the archipelago was administratively and postally united to the colony of Madagascar.

From 1950, the four Comorian islands were given stamps labelled "Archipel des Comores". After the independence of three of the Comoros islands in 1975, two services existed: the Comorian and the French post in Mayotte, whose inhabitants refused independence by referendum.

== Before the joining to Madagascar in 1911 ==
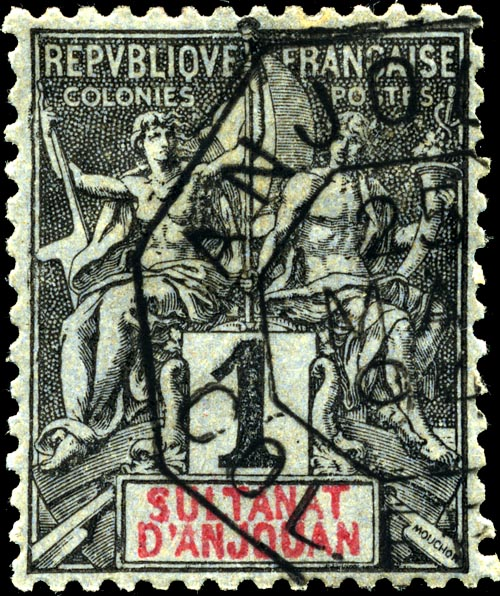
1-centime stamp of Anjouan, 1892

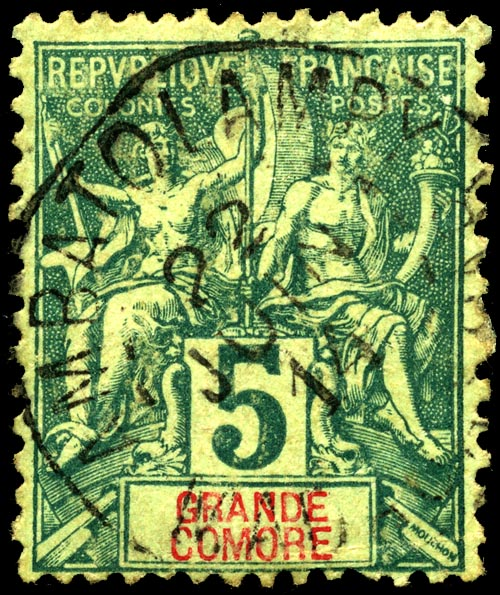
5-centime stamp of Grand Comoro, 1897

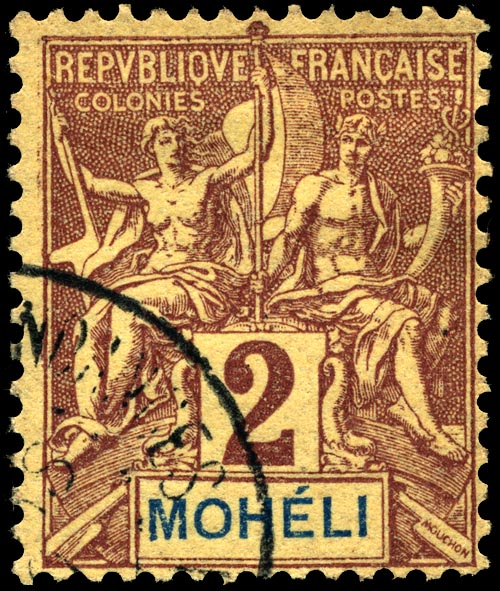
2-centime from the Group series of Mohéli, 1906

A very few numbers of letters posted before 1900 in the Comoros are known. The oldest came from Mayotte in December 1850 and do not bear a postage stamp.

Mayotte became a French colony at the beginning of the 1840s after commander Passot bought it to sultan Andriantsouly.

The first stamps from the Imperial Eagle series, common to all French colonies, are sent late 1861-start 1862. They were dispatched between Mayotte and Nosy Be, a northern Madagascar island. The oldest known stamped letter from Mayotte is dated December 1863.

When the French influence extended to Mohéli, Grande Comore and Anjouan, the Frenchmen must have used the postal service based in Mayotte. Eagle stamps and French stamps (non perforated in the colonies) were certainly used. But, on the datestamp, it was always written "Mayotte and dependencies" (Mayotte et dépendances). Unless the address of the sender or the letter can give hints, it is impossible to recognize the real origin of a Comorian letter of that time. Until the 1870s, the postage stamp itself was cancelled with rhombus of points with a hole in the middle; it is impossible to know where an unstuck stamp was used.

Following excess by French adventurer Léon Humblot against Comorian people, the French Navy intervened in the archipelago and imposed the French administration. Mayotte was kept at the center of the new organisation.

Progressively, like all French colonies, each island received stamps with its name: the postal administration was victim of a stamp traffic between low-valued currency colonies and high-valued currency colonies. Mayotte and the "sultanat d'Anjouan" received them in November 1892, Grande Comore in November 1897 and Mohéli in 1906. Twenty values were issued in Mayotte, Nineteen in Anjouan and Grande Comore, sixteen in Mohéli.

== From Madagascar to the Comoros Archipelago (1911–1975) ==
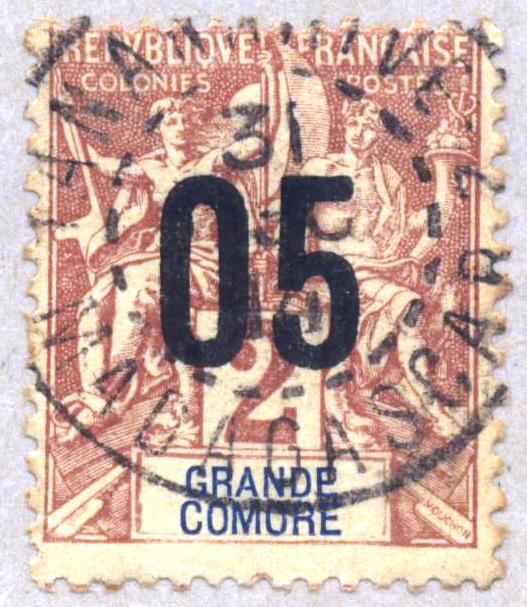
2 centimes stamp of Grand Comoro overprinted in 1912

After the decision to unite Comoros to the Madagascar colony, the postal fusion is effective in 1912. The remaining stamps are overprinted with big black and red "05" and "10" to serve at small values of five and ten centimes. All post offices of the former colonies linked now to Madagascar did the same; overprinted stamps were accepted every where in the colony.

From 1912 to 1950, Madagascar stamps are used in the Comoros. Collectors look for the place of cancellation to find Comorian items.

The situation changed in 1946 when the archipelago was no more a colony, but an oversea territory of France: specific stamps are issued on 15 May 1950 printed "Archipel des Comores" with value in CFA franc. The first series showed local landscapes. Aquatic fauna and flora of the Comoros, traditions, arts and crafts constituted the most part of the philatelic program, with the French colonies' omnibus issues.

The first person to be honored by a Comoros Archipelago stamps was Charles de Gaulle in 1971, using two of the Metropolitan French series. Then, international scientists and artists are commemorated between 1972 and 1973. Finally, two local personalities appeared: president Said Mohamed Cheikh (died 1970) on two 1973 stamps and Saïd Omar ben Soumeth, Comoros' grand mufti in 1974.

== Since Independence in 1975 ==
Following the 1974 referendums, the Comorian Parliament voted for independence on 5 July 1975. The postage stamp stocks were in Moroni on Grande Comore. They were overprinted to strike mentions of French sovereignty and to add "État comorien" (Comorian State).

In 1976 and 1977, under President Ali Soilih, Comoros underwent a philatelic issue frenzy: within these two years, the country had issued more stamps than during all the years of the Comorian Archipelago (1946–1975). Moreover, few of these stamps concerned local topics. New topics included space exploration, Winter Olympic Games, etc.

During the Federal and Islamic Republic of Comoros, philatelic programs returned to subjects of local interest.

=== Secession of Anjouan and Mohéli in 1997 ===
Between 1997 and 2000, secessionist events occurred on Anjouan and Mohéli islands which were finally resolved with the creation of the Union of Comoros.

Symbols of the flag of Anjouan were used on stamps and labels between 1997 and 2001.

On Anjouan, postage stamps may have circulated in mail. Only one revenue stamp with the map and flag of Anjouan, printed in France, served on a legal document.

End 1997-beginning 1998, French philatelic magazines reported a message announcing the opening of a private postal service between Anjouan and French-controlled Mayotte. The stamp used on the received letters (map and symbols of Anjouan, and the flag of France) represented the cost of the transport by dhow between the islands. In Mayotte, a French stamp was added and put in a French post box. However, it seems no proof of real service exists.

== Synthesis ==
Years	Stamps in use
Colony then oversea territory of France
1850?–1861?	None
1861?–1892	General Colonies stamps
1892–1912	Mayotte; Sultanat d'Anjouan
1897–1912	Grande Comore
1906–1912	Mohéli
1912–1950	Madagascar
1950–1975	Archipel des Comores
Independence
1975-1975	~~Archipel des Comores~~; État comorien
1976–1977	État comorien
1977–1979	République des Comores
1979–2000	Rép. féd. islamique des Comores
2000–...	Union des Comores
Legend
	Supposed date of first used. (Mayotte).
~~strike~~	overprinted mention

== See also ==
- Postage stamps and postal history of Madagascar
- Postage stamps and postal history of Mayotte
- Postage stamps and postal history of Anjouan

== Sources ==
- On the French period: Catalogue de cotations des timbres des DOM-TOM, Dallay, 2006–2007, pages 358 to 399.
- Philatelic section of the Comores-online.com website^{[usurped]}.
