= Académie de philatélie =

French philatelic voluntary association

The Académie de philatélie (Academy of Philately in English) is a French philatelic voluntary association created in 1928. Its goal is to promote philately and philatelic studies.

The Académie's headquarters is hosted in La Poste's Museum in Paris, a postal museum the association fought for in the 1930s. Part of the museum library, open to the public, is a loan of the Académie.

The Académie's emblem is the Ceres head designed by Jacques-Jean Barre for the first postage stamp of France.

== History ==
On 25 May 1928, Gaston Tournier, editor-in-chief of Le Messager philatélie, launched the project of an academy whose members would be important and recognized philatelists. The magazine's readers were invited to elect the 25 founding members, without any list be proposed.

On 19 December 1928, took place the inaugural setting of the Académie de philatélie. The 25 elected members adopted the rules to become a member: the forty full members (membre titulaire) would be French nationals and chosen by the sitting full members. Thirty foreign members (membre étranger) are created too. In the following years, a member has to be a corresponding member (membre correspondant) to pretend for full membership. Members are named for a lifelong tenure, but those who want to retire because they do no more have enough time can be appointed the title of honorary member (membre honoraire).

The main public actions of the Académie was to militate for the creation of a French postal museum and to help constitute its collections and library.

== Activities ==
During its private regular sessions, the members of the Académie de philatélie organise philatelic and marcophilic conferences.

Since 1959, the Académie edits a trimestrial revue, Documents philatéliques filled by its members. In 1968, the first two tomes of an Encyclopédie du timbre-poste was published.

Each year, if the Académie recognizes enough merits, philatelists non-members of the Académie can be awarded in three main domains:

- literary (since 1930) for the best philatelic book of the year,
- philatelic (since 2001) for the best philatelic exhibition saw at the Fédération française des associations philatéliques Congress' national exhibit,
- internet (since 2001) for the best philatelic website. This award was given only in 2001 to Robert Désert for a website about the French post offices in the Ottoman Empire.

== Honors ==
In 1978, a stamp on stamp was issued by the French post for the 50th anniversary of the Académie. It represented the Sower by Oscar Roty and the Ceres head by Barre. It was designed by Académie's member Charles Bridoux and engraved by Claude Haley.

== Publications ==
- Encyclopédie du timbre-poste de France [Encyclopaedia of the Postage Stamps of France] :
  - tome 1, 1849-1852 issues (Ceres and Presidency), published 1968;
  - tome 2, 1853-1870 issues, published in fascicules since 1992.
- Documents philatéliques, trimestrial revue, since 1959.

== Some members ==
Among Académie's members, the following have a Wikipedia article:

- Alan K. Huggins, postal stationery specialist
- Jean-Pierre Mangin
- Eugène Vaillé, postal museum curator
- Pierre Yvert, catalogue editor
- Steven Walske
