= J. T. Whitney =

John Timothy Whitney (14 December 1945 – 15 December 1990), known also as Tim Whitney, was an expert on British postmarks who wrote a popular catalogue on the subject that has been through many editions, and the definitive guide to the stamps and postal history of the Isle of Man. He was also an expert on the philately of the French coastal islands.

The eldest of three brothers, Tim obtained a degree in theology from Oxford University and in 1975 a Ph.D. from Nottingham University.

He ran the religious studies department at South East Essex Sixth Form College for many years, where his wife Diana also worked. They had three children. He was known there as 'the Doc' and was also ordained a Baptist Minister, as his father, Joseph Charles Whitney, had been. His mother was Doris Whitney, who wrote several devotional books for Baptist churches.

He had had muscular dystrophy since his teens and was an active fundraiser for MD causes. He died in Southend-On-Sea, Essex, the day after his 45th birthday.

== Selected publications ==
- Collect British Postmarks. 4th edition. Benfleet, Essex: J.T. Whitney, 1987. ISBN 0-9511867-0-1
- Isle of Man Handbook of Stamps and Postal History. Chippenham, Wiltshire: Picton Publishing & B.P.H. Publications Ltd., 1981 ISBN 0-902633-67-8, 309p.
