= Postage stamps and postal history of Anjouan =

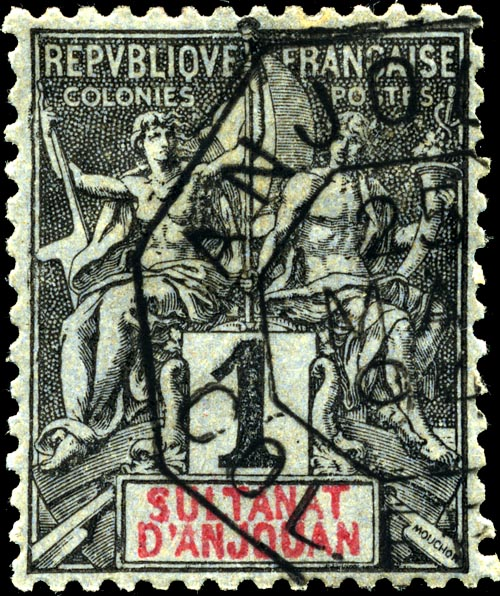
1-centime Navigation and Commerce, postmarked on 25 May 1894

In 1892 the French omnibus Navigation and Commerce issue of postage stamps included types specifically intended for use in the island of Anjouan. These were inscribed "SULTANAT / D'ANJOUAN". A series of surcharged values issued in 1912 was available for use in Madagascar and all of the Comoros, and thereafter stamps of Madagascar were used. In 1950, Anjouan used the stamps of the Comoros.

== See also ==
- Postage stamps and postal history of the Comoros
- Postage stamps and postal history of Madagascar

== Sources ==
- Stanley Gibbons Ltd: various catalogues
- Encyclopaedia of Postal History
- Rossiter, Stuart & John Flower. The Stamp Atlas. London: Macdonald, 1986. ISBN 0-356-10862-7
