= Eugène Vaillé =

French postal historian

Eugène Vaillé (French pronunciation: [øʒɛn vaje]; 10 August 1875, Bédarieux, Hérault - 1959, Riols) was a French postal historian and the first curator of the postal museum of France, now La Poste's Museum, from 1946 to 1955.

== Biography ==
Born in Bédarieux, in the département of Hérault, Vaillé was a Doctor of Law. In 1920, he was hired by the Minister of Posts, Telegraphs and Telephones (PTT) as a librarian. Over the next ten years, he managed the central library of the PTT.

In 1936, he convinced PTT Minister Georges Mandel to restart the project to create a postal museum, which had been originally proposed around the turn of the 20th century. Even if the economic crisis of the 1930s and World War II prevented any concrete action, Vaillé inventoried the collections and material available in the PTT's archives and libraries. In 1943, he became president of the future museum's ruling board.

On 4 June 1946, he became its first curator with the inauguration of the Postal Museum of France. The museum was installed in the Choiseul-Praslin residence in the 6th arrondissement of Paris. He retired in 1955.

He was elected as a titular member of the Académie de philatélie in 1938, and then as an honorary member in 1955. He wrote a seven-volume "General History of the French Posts", published between 1947 and 1955.

== Publications ==
- (1947-1955). Histoire générale des Postes françaises [General History of the French Posts], 7 volumes, Paris, Presses universitaires de France.
- (1946). Histoire des postes françaises jusqu'à la Révolution [History of the French Posts until the Revolution], "Que sais-je ?" collection, #200, Presses universitaires de France.
- (1947). Histoire des postes françaises depuis la Révolution [History of the French Posts since the Revolution], "Que sais-je ?" collection, #260, Presses universitaires de France.
- (1950). Le Cabinet noir. Histoire du contrôle et de la violation de la correspondance privée [The Black Room. History of the Control and Violation of the Private Correspondence], Paris, Presses universitaires de France.
- (1952). La Poste en France au milieu du XXe siècle [French Post in the middle of the 20th Century], Paris, Postal Museum. Engravings by Henry Cheffer, Paul Dufresne, Albert Decaris, Paul-Pierre Lemagny, Charles Mazelin and cover in colors by René Dessirier.
- (1959). Histoire du timbre-poste [History of the Postage Stamp], "Que sais-je ?" collection, #273, Presses universitaires de France.

He wrote fables under the pseudonym of Jean Coulanges.

== Sources and references ==
- Martin Hella (December 2006). « Du Musée postal de France au musée de La Poste » [From the Postal Museum of France to La Poste's Museum]. L'Écho de la timbrologie #1802, pages 38–42.
