= Post Mark Collectors Club =

National organization that promotes the collecting of postmarks

The Post Mark Collectors Club is a non-profit, national organization that promotes the collecting of postmarks and the study of postal history. The Club sponsors an annual convention and the National Postmark Museum in Bellevue, Ohio.

The PMCC maintains the Post Office Directory, the most accurate list of Post Offices available. These listings detail postal operations in all 50 states, some Canadian provinces, and U.S. possessions. Each year the PMCC holds an annual Convention in a different part of the U.S. hosted by member(s) of the club, offering free postmarks, cachets, benefit auctions, exhibits, tours and more. The Post Mark Collectors Club is affiliate #62 of the American Philatelic Society (APS). Its 2023 convention is scheduled for September 21-23, 2023, in Terrell, Texas.

== History ==
The Post Mark Collectors Club (PMCC) began in 1941 by Charles Strobel of Cleveland, Ohio. However, World War II intervened and Mr. Strobel's health was poor, so the PMCC was reorganized in 1946 under the guidance of Rev. Walter Smith in Maine. By 1950, the Postal Cancellations Society (PCS), founded by Kenneth Rinker merged with PMCC.

In 1974, Herbert H. Harrington, then president of the club, wrote to several members of Congress to object to the removal of town names from canceled postage due to the introduction by the United States Postal Service of automated sorting and canceling machines, which he said were, "taking the romance out of post marks."

== Bulletin ==
In October 1947, the PMCC Bulletin was first published by Rev. Smith and Robert K. Francis. The mimeographed issue was three pages long. The award-winning newsletter is published eleven times a year with news, photos and postmark collecting information. The current editor of the PMCC Bulletin is Bill German.

== Museum ==
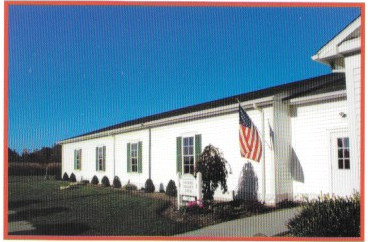
Current Postmark Museum building, 2003

The start of the PMCC Museum, goes back to 1957. Margie Pfund of Columbiana, Ohio, devoted a 7 foot by 10 foot room of her farmhouse for the museum. Pfund and her husband helped play an important role of the club. She, and her husband, Art, were the curators. Soon, they moved the PMCC Museum to a larger room in an added wing of the house. The Pfund's received help in the museum from nearby members.

In 1963 the museum was dedicated as the Margie Pfund Memorial Postmark Museum and Library to honor the many hours she spent building PMCC enthusiasm and making the museum a success.

Bernice Mittower was the museum curator from 1969 to 1994 and a cornerstone of the PMCC Museum for 25 years. She was a driving force behind its growth, moving the collection from a bus located on her farm to Historic Lyme Village in 1978.

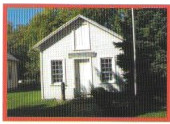
Lyme Post Office Building moved to the Postmark Museum in 1978.

Its new home was the original Lyme Post Office, which had been relocated to Historic Lyme Village by the PMCC. In 1993 the museum collection was transferred again to the larger Groton Township building.

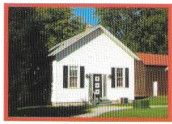
Groton township hall was moved to the Postmark Museum in 1993.

The current home of the PMCC Museum was dedicated on October 23, 2003. This expansive space was built entirely with donations from PMCC members.

The Museum's holdings make up the largest single Postmark collection in the world, grouping nearly two million different postal history items. The library contains reference material on postmark collecting from all 50 states, as well as from Canada and many other countries around the world. Along with postmarks and research materials, the Museum has a fine collection of vintage post office memorabilia. Special collections of postmark slogans, such as the "Pray for Peace" postmark series are the highlights of the holdings.

The museum is situated in Historic Lyme Village, just east of Bellevue, Ohio, on State Road 4, near Route 113. The current curator of the museum is Gary Hendren.
