= Théodule Tellier =

Théodule Tellier (circa 1856 – March 1922) was a French printer and the co-founder with Louis Yvert of French philatelic publisher Yvert et Tellier. He participated in its publication from 1895 to 1913.

== Biography ==
In 1879 in Amiens, Tellier was hired at the printing company of Henry Yvert. He climbed the ranks and finally became chief-printer.

When Henry Yvert died in 1885, his widow associated her family to Tellier, until her son Louis would be ready to join the firm. Tellier directed the typographic plant, then all of the Yvert printing operations by 1889.

Tellier was a stamp collector, too, a passion he had discovered in the 1870s with the German stamps for Alsace-Lorraine. He printed L'Écho de la timbrologie, a philatelic bulletin written by Edmond Frémy of Douai. Suffering an illness, Frémy gave away his bulletin to Tellier in 1890. At the beginning of the 1890s, readers were asking for an exhaustive stamp album and catalog, and a service offering stamps of the world by mail order.

After Louis Yvert became initiated into stamp collecting by Tellier, both decided in 1895 to make philatelic publications the main activity of the Yvert family company. In November 1896, they published the first Catalogue prix-courant de timbres-poste par Yvert et Tellier, alongside a stamp album.

With the prosperity of the Yvert et Tellier company, Théodule Tellier attended to the firm's daily operations while Yvert travelled for philatelic purposes. But Tellier decided to retire after the death of his grandson and sold his shares to Louis Yvert on 1 April 1913. Nevertheless, Yvert decided to maintain his friend's name in the catalog's title.

Tellier lived some years at a farm near Amiens. He died in this town in the night between the 3rd and 4 March 1922.

== Sources ==
- Yvert et Tellier. Cent ans d'histoire. Amiens, France: Yvert et Tellier. 1996. The book was published for the centenary of the company.
- Yvert, Louis (15 March 1922). "Théodule Tellier". L'Écho de la timbrologie. This text is a necrology.
