= Louis Yvert =

French philatelist

- Born: June 24, 1866; Paris, France
- Died: 17 April 1950 (aged 0); Amiens, France
- Occupations: Philatelist, Publisher
- Known for: Co-founder of Yvert et Tellier

Louis Yvert (born 24 June 1866 in Paris and died 17 April 1950 in Amiens) was the co-founder of French philatelic publisher Yvert et Tellier with printer Théodule Tellier. The firm grew from the family-printing company established in the 1830s by his grandfather, legitimist journalist Eugène Yvert.

== Early life ==
Louis Yvert was the son of lawyer Henry Yvert and Mademoiselle de Taisy, then first singer at the Paris Opera. When he was four years old his parents moved to Amiens, where his father bought Eugène Yvert's company. Henry founded a new legitimist paper, L'Écho de la Somme. After his baccalauréats es-literature and es-sciences, Louis served voluntarily in the army. Then, he began his Law studies in Paris, where he lived like a dandy.

His father died in 1885, but his mother decided that Louis must finished his studies before becoming the new director of the Yvert company. She associated her family to the chief-printer Théodule Tellier.

== Career ==
When Louis returned to Amiens in 1889, he wrote for L'Écho de la Somme. In 1891, he married and became the paper's director. While he disliked the political, legimist and conservative way of thinking of the paper and its readers, L'Écho de la Somme remained the main beneficial source of the Yvert et Tellier printing company.

The discovery of stamp collecting changed everything. Thank to Théodule Tellier, Louis Yvert became a collector, interested himself in L'Écho de la timbrologie, a philatelic paper Tellier bought in 1890. He saw the interest of collectors for printed stamp albums and exhaustive catalogs.

In 1895, he ceased to write in L'Écho de la Somme and directed all his efforts to philatelic matters. Tellier and Yvert's main idea had been a catalog whose numeration would be permanent, unlike many catalogs of that era who changed their numeration and criteria each year. The first edition of the Catalogue prix-courant de timbres-poste par Yvert et Tellier was published in November 1896 priced at two francs. Eight thousand 576 page catalogs were printed, listing five thousands postage stamps. Success was quick and the catalog was published annually.

Yvert travelled across Western Europe while Tellier managed day-to-day operations. During a stay in Paris in 1900, Yvert met Genevois stamp dealer Théodore Champion. This expert associated himself with Yvert and Tellier. Until his death in 1954, Champion prepared the cotations published in the catalogue Yvert et Tellier - Champion.

1 April 1913, Tellier retired and sold his part of the business to Yvert, but, although the chief-printer's name remained in the catalog title.

In the first half of the 20th century, Yvert et Tellier became the philatelic reference in France.

== Legacy ==
Progressively, during the interwar period, Yvert prepared his succession. He put his two sons and his son-in-law at key posts of the company

- Henri Yvert ran the printer plant
- Pierre Yvert directed L'Écho de la timbrologie and travelled like his father for philatelic relationships
- Jean Gervais abandoned a doctor career to marry Louis' daughter, Jeanne. In exchange, the father made him responsible for the publishing house (books, albums, catalogs).

Louis Yvert died in Amiens in 1950.

== Sources ==
Yvert et Tellier. Cent ans d'histoire. Amiens, France: Yvert et Tellier. 1996. The book was published for the centenary of the company.
