= Pierre Yvert =

French philatelist (1900–1964)

- Born: September 30, 1980; Amiens, France
- Died: January 13, 1964 (aged 63)
- Relatives: Louis Yvert
- Military career
- Conflicts: World War I
- Awards: Cross of War medal

Pierre Yvert (30 September 1900 – 13 January 1964) was a French philatelic editor. Son of Louis Yvert, one of Yvert et Tellier's founders, he was manager of magazine L'Écho de la timbrologie and of many philatelic associations.

== Biography ==
He was born in Amiens and in 1917, he volunteered in the French army and fought during World War I. For his actions, he received the Cross of War medal.

After his studies, during the interwar period, Pierre was appointed by his father Louis, founder of Yvert et Tellier, to be a writer in L'Écho de la timbrologie redaction. Successful in this task, he became manager of the magazine that had been printed by the family company in Amiens since the 1880s. He travelled a lot like his father for philatelic purposes : visiting philatelic exhibitions, participating to the main association meetings.

During the German occupation of France, he made the family printer survived with the lack of workers and paper. In 1945 he became a soldier again to free the port of Saint-Nazaire.

1955, he let his place of l'Écho de la philatélie manager to his son Jean.

He died in 1964.

== Association member ==
Pierre Yvert is the founder of a French philatelic press union (Syndicat de la presse philatélique française), that became the latter Association de la presse philatelique francophone (French-speaking Philatelic Press Association). Elected president of the International Federation of Stamp Dealer Associations, he was chosen in January 1943 to sit in the 17th chair of the French Académie de philatélie.

Outside the philatelic universe, he was first world vice-president of the Rotary International. Even locally, he was in 1952 president of the Automobile Club of Picardie and Artois.

== Sources ==
- Yvert et Tellier. Cent ans d'histoire. Amiens, France: Yvert et Tellier. 1996. The book was published for the centenary of the company.
