= Postal marking =

Any annotation applied to a letter by a postal service

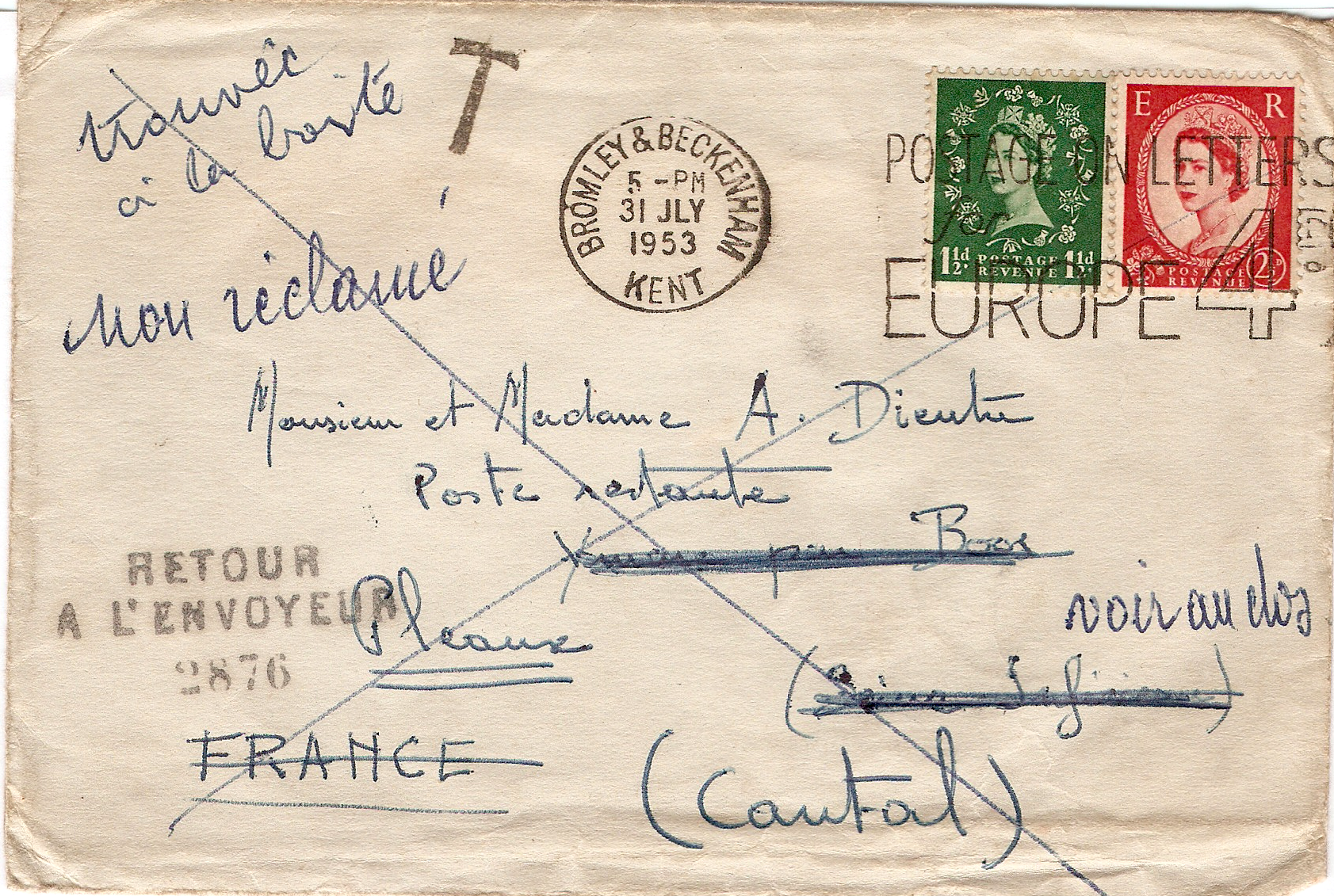
This 1953 cover has a normal postmark and two French service markings.

A postal marking is any kind of annotation applied to a letter by a postal service. The most common types are postmarks and cancellations; almost every letter will have those. Less common types include forwarding addresses, routing annotations, warnings, postage due notices and explanations, such as for damaged or delayed mail, and censored or inspected mail. A key part of postal history is the identification of postal markings, their purpose, and period of use.

Service marks provide information to the sender, recipient, or another post office. Advice marks notify about forwarding, missending, letters received in bad condition, letters received too late for delivery by a certain time, or the reason for a delay in mail delivery. (For example, a letter may be marked "snowbank" if snow accumulation not cleared by the potential recipient, or for whatever other reason, makes it difficult or impossible for the carrier to deliver the mail.) Dead letter offices would use various markings to keep track of their progress in finding the addressee, such as a notation that the letter had been advertised in the local newspaper. The tracking process for registered mail may entail multiple marks, notations, and backstamps.

Auxiliary marks are applied by an organization other than the postal administration. For instance, 19th century mail delivery often relied on a mix of private ships, steamboats, stagecoaches, railroads, and other transportation organizations to transport mail. Many of these organizations applied their own markings to each item, sometimes saying simply "Steamship" or similar, while others had elaborate designs. Similar routing notations were also used in the early days of airmail.

Shortly after the outbreak of the American Civil War, the Northern authorities declared the existing postage stamps invalid and issued new types. Letters using the demonetized stamps received a marking "Old stamps not recognized", an unintentionally humorous comment much prized by collectors today.

Post offices may add cachets for special events such as a first flight.

The traditional way to apply a postal marking is with the use of a rubber or metal handstamp; handwritten notations are sometimes seen for unusual situations or in very small post offices. In the United States, modern postal markings may appear in the form of yellow adhesive labels with the text printed on them. Many postal administrations now have the ability to print inkjet annotations directly onto a cover, either as a barcode for reading by other equipment, or as text.

Although it is technically possible to query postal services to find out what kinds of postal markings they use, in practice they may not know about all the kinds of handstamps used in their offices, and previously unknown types of postal markings, both early and modern, regularly come to light. Hundreds of specialized works make up the philatelic literature of postal markings.

== See also ==
- Indicia (philately)
