= Postage stamps and postal history of Diego-Suárez =

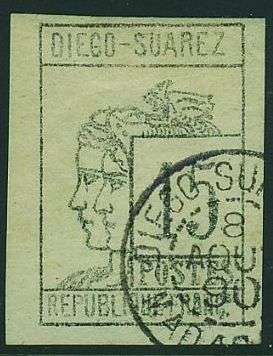
An 1890 stamp of Diego-Suarez

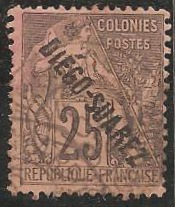
French colonial general issues overprinted for Diego-Suarez in 1892

Diego-Suárez is a city at the northern tip of Madagascar in Antsiranana province. It was a French colony in the late 19th century until the colony's administration was subsumed into that of Madagascar in 1896. It was renamed as Antsiranana in 1975.

== Postage Stamps ==
The colony issued its own postage stamps from 1890 to 1894, producing over 60 types.

== See also ==
- Antsiranana
- Postage stamps and postal history of Madagascar

== Sources ==
- Stanley Gibbons: various catalogues
- Encyclopaedia of Postal Authorities
- Rossiter, Stuart & John Flower. The Stamp Atlas. London: Macdonald, 1986, p. 331. ISBN 0-356-10862-7
