= Timbres Magazine =

French magazine about philately and stamp collecting

- Timbres magazine cover May 2014
- Frequency: Monthly
- Publisher: Le Monde
- Country: France

Timbres Magazine is a French monthly magazine about philately and stamp collecting. It was established in 2000 by the merger of three previous publications: Timbroscopie and Timbroloisirs, both from the philatelic publisher Timbropresse, and Le Monde des philatélistes, from the Le Monde group.

In the 2000s, it was one of two major French philatelic magazines with L'Écho de la timbrologie.

== Pre-Merger ==
Le Monde began publishing a weekly philately column in 1946. The columnist, Adalbert Vitalyos, obtained permission from Le Monde's founder Hubert Beuve-Méry to publish a separate magazine about stamps, Le Monde des philatélistes ("The World of Philatelists" or "Le Monde for Philatelists"), whose first edition came out in October 1951. Vitalyos was the editor-in-chief from 1953 to 1977, and continued to write a weekly column until 1986.

In 1954, the magazine took the subtitle L'officiel de la philatélie (the Philatelic Gazette) after it bought three other publications, one of which had this subtitle. In March 2000, when Le Monde des philatélistes ended its run, this became Timbres magazine's slogan.

Timbroscopie was the figurehead magazine of the publisher Timbropresse. Created by Georges Bartoli, it was published between March 1984 and March 2000 with the subtitle le magazine de la philatélie active (the Magazine of Active Philately).

Timbropresse's companion magazine for youth was Timbroloisirs, whose goal was to extend the readership of Timbroscopie to philatelic beginners as well as to give confirmed philatelists new ideas for reorganising collections (by country, topic, etc.). Timbroloisirs included detachable cardboard stamp albums for such reorganisations, an innovation continued by Timbres magazine after the merger. Timbroloisirs' goals were summarized in the subtitle le magazine des collectionneurs heureux (the Magazine of Happy Collectors).

In March 2000, after its 125th issue, Timbroloisirs was incorporated into Timbres magazine along with Le Monde des philatélistes and Timbroscopie.

== Timbres magazine ==
In 2000, the combined editorial staffs tried to keep what they thought best of the three original magazines: detailed knowledge and exacting research from Le Monde des philatélistes and Timbroscopie, with lighter topical philately inspired by Timbroloisirs.

In the 2000s, under the direction of editor-in-chief Gauthier Toulemonde, Timbres magazine went beyond reporting philatelic news and sought to influence policy. In September 2004, it launched a petition to the French postal service in favour of collectors' preference for engraved stamps and those printed using intaglio, as opposed to computer-aided engraving. That movement became the start of a non-profit organization at the end of 2004, The Art of the Graven Stamp. The magazine published several special issues devoted to the subject.

In 2005, Toulemonde and the magazine decided to document a few letters' postal journeys. Toulemonde started in an exotic location, travelled with the mail, and filmed its adventures en route to the post offices where he delivered it. He began with uninhabited Clipperton Island during French explorer Jean-Louis Étienne's 2005 expedition, and continued with the North Pole, and the Maroni River in French Guiana in 2006. These filmed travels were released as a DVD in Autumn 2006.

Between 2007 and 2009, with technical support from the Place de la Toile society, Timbres magazine ran a television website, TV Timbres, showing free philatelic documentaries.

As of 2010, the magazine's circulation was 40,000.
