= Yvert et Tellier =

French philately publisher

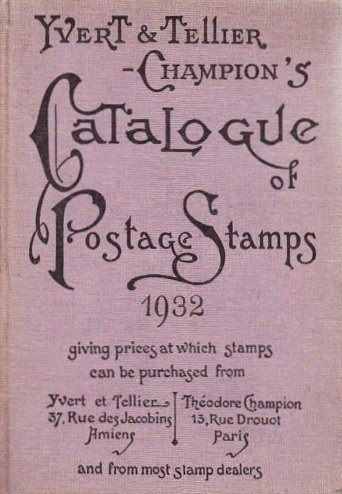
The cover of Yvert & Tellier – Champion's Catalogue of Postage Stamps 1932.

Yvert et Tellier is a postage stamp dealer and a philatelic publishing company founded in 1895 in the northern French city of Amiens, where the head office is still located. The logo is a circle divided into a snowflake and a smiling sun. It is a pun on the name of the company: hiver, été liés ("winter, summer together") sounds a lot like the French pronunciation of Yvert et Tellier.

The family company was founded by Eugène Yvert in 1831 as a printing works for a legitimist newspaper. The switch to philately was decided 1895 by Eugène's grandson Louis Yvert and his chief printer Théodule Tellier. Nowadays the company is still run by the Yvert family.

== Products ==
Yvert et Tellier's major product is a stamp catalog which is a reference for stamps and countries that are most collected by French philatelists: France, Andorra, Monaco, and the former French colonies and their philatelic history as independent states. In France, it is one of the most important philatelic publishing companies, along with Cérès and Dallay.

Continuing the old association between Louis Yvert and Théodore Champion, the Ancienne Maison Théodore Champion edits monthly and yearly a colour catalog of newly issued stamps from all over the world. Usually, Yvert catalogs for non-European countries were printed in black and white, but in 2008 they started with full color prints.

It is one of the international references as well, with Michel, Scott and Stanley Gibbons. The Yvert catalogs list stamps issued by all countries in the world, but for non-European countries, the volumes are organized in alphabetic order whereas the German company Michel uses a geographical classification.

== History ==
=== Genesis and management successions ===
During the 1890s in Amiens, the Yvert family's printing works is the property of Louis Yvert, grandson of the founder, and his chief printer Théodule Tellier; Tellier kept the company running after the premature death of Louis' father. Louis did not like being in charge of the legimist paper founded by his father, L'Écho de la Somme. He discovered stamp collecting thanks to Tellier, a philatelist, who had already added a small philatelic newspaper, L'Écho de la timbrologie, to the papers printed by the company.

In 1895, Yvert and Tellier started getting involved in philatelic books. In November 1896 they published a worldwide catalog of stamps and a stamp album. The success was immediate because of their logical and permanent numbering, in contrast to most of their contemporaries, who changed the numbers in their catalogues upon discovering forgotten stamps.

In 1900, Yvert et Tellier associated with Paris stamp dealer Théodore Champion, who sold unused stamps from all over the world. He fixed the prices of the stamps sold by the company. After Champion's death in 1955, Pierre Yvert and the brothers Ladislas and Alexandre Varga bought Champion's company and the new firm continued to fix Yvert et Tellier's prices.

In April 1913, Tellier sold his share of the company to Louis Yvert because of the loss of his young grandson. Due to their friendship, Yvert decided that the catalog would continue to be named Yvert et Tellier.

During the 1920s and 1930s, Yvert prepared his two sons and his son-in-law to run the firm. Henri ran the printing works, his brother Pierre directed L'Écho de la timbrologie, and Jean Gervais took care of the publishing.

Pierre Yvert's and Jean Gervais' two grandsons have run the company since the 1990s.

=== Recent commercial history ===
Since 2001 the apparition of the Dallay catalog has had a major effect on the French philatelist public by providing larger pictures of stamps and information not found in the Yvert et Tellier catalogs, such as the name of the artiste and/or engraver, first date of issue, use, etc. Yvert has been fighting on two fronts: it has successfully defended the rights to its numbering system, and it distributes a free CD-ROM with its French stamp catalog.

Nevertheless, in March 2005, by urging of the French Conseil de la concurrence, Yvert agreed to sell the use of the Yvert stamp numbers to other publishers.

In June 2006 Yvert et Tellier published a new catalog of French stamps, a cheaper pocketbook version containing just pictures and prices, as did Cérès, the second main philatelic publishing company in France.

=== Genealogy of the Yvert family ===
The Yvert printing company and Yvert et Tellier editor have been ruling mostly by members of the Yvert family. This family tree presents the people who managed these two companies since they were found in the 19th century.

Eugène Yvert (circa 1794-1878), journalist, and founder of the printer company in Amiens where he moved to create a legimist paper.

│
└──> Henry Yvert (died 1885), the company's owner after 1870, legitimist journalist too.
     │
     └──> Louis Yvert (1866–1950), co-founder of the Yvert et Tellier catalog with Théodule Tellier.
          │
          ├──> Henri Yvert (died 1956), manager of the printer plant.
          │    
          │
          ├──> Jeanne Yvert
          │    married Jean Gervais (died 1974), a physician, then manager of the Yvert et Tellier publisher.
          │    │
          │    └──> Jacques Gervais, président-directeur général of Yvert et Tellier.
          │         │
          │         └──> Benoît Gervais, succeeded his father in 1993.[1]
          │
          └──> Pierre Yvert (1900–1964), manager of L'Écho de la timbrologie magazine.
               │
               └──> Jean Yvert, succeeded his father and manager of the printer plant.
                    │
                    └──> Christophe Yvert, manager of the printer plant.[2]

== See also ==
=== Sources ===
- Yvert et Tellier. Cent ans d'histoire. Amiens, France: Yvert et Tellier. 1996. The book was published for the centenary of the company. It presented the history of the Yvert family and their company.
