= Adalbert Vitalyos =

French journalist and philatelist

Adalbert Vitalyos (10 July 1914 – 24 May 2000) was a French journalist born in Hungary. He was the creator of the philatelic magazine Le Monde des philatélistes.

== Early life ==
Vitalyos was born 10 July 1914 in Szolnok, Hungary.

== France ==
Arriving in France in 1929, he became French in 1932. In 1935, he became typographer/linotypist at the journal Le Temps.

Prisoner of war from 20 June 1940 to 1943, he returned to work in a printer of Temps, later working for Le Monde. He took part in the printing of the first issue, dated 19 December 1944.

In 1946, this stamp collector launched a weekly section in the magazine supplement of Une semaine dans le monde. With the disappearance of this supplement in 1948, this was, until 1986 integrated into Le Monde.

With the help of Hubert Beuve-Méry, he created Le Monde des philatélistes, a stamp collecting magazine, first issued 13 October 1951. He was editor in chief from October 1953 until June 1977.

He was heavily involved in a philatelic press association, which joined another association in 1994 to form the Association de la presse philatélique francophone.

== Bibliography ==
- Jean-Claude Rouy, "Adalbert Vitalyos. Le cofondateur, avec Hubert Beuve-Méry, du Monde des philatélistes" [Adalbert Vitalyos. The cofounder, with Hubert Beuve-Méry, of Le Monde des philatélistes], obituary published in Le Monde, 17 June 2000.
