= Backstamp =

Postal marking

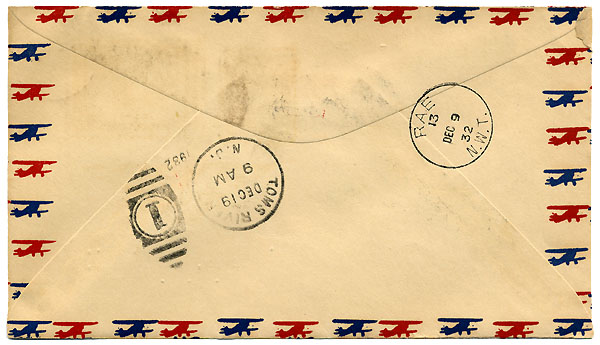
This reverse of a 1932 cover sent from Rae in the Northwest Territories (now Behchoko) to Toms River, New Jersey, has a Toms River backstamp.

In philately a backstamp is a postmark on the back of a letter showing a post office or station through which the item passed in transit. The office of delivery may also backstamp a cover and this type of mark is known as a receiving mark. It provided a way to track the route of a letter, simplifying the overall process of mailing.

Backstamps are often applied as documentation of transit times, lengthy ones in the case of ocean crossings or short ones in the case of airmail flights. Registered mail is often backstamped in order to show the chain of custody.

Mail that has had complex routings can have a dozen or more backstamps. Although such covers may look positively blackened with the overlapping marks, they are not common and so are highly valued by collectors of postal history, being described as "well travelled".
