= Marcophily =

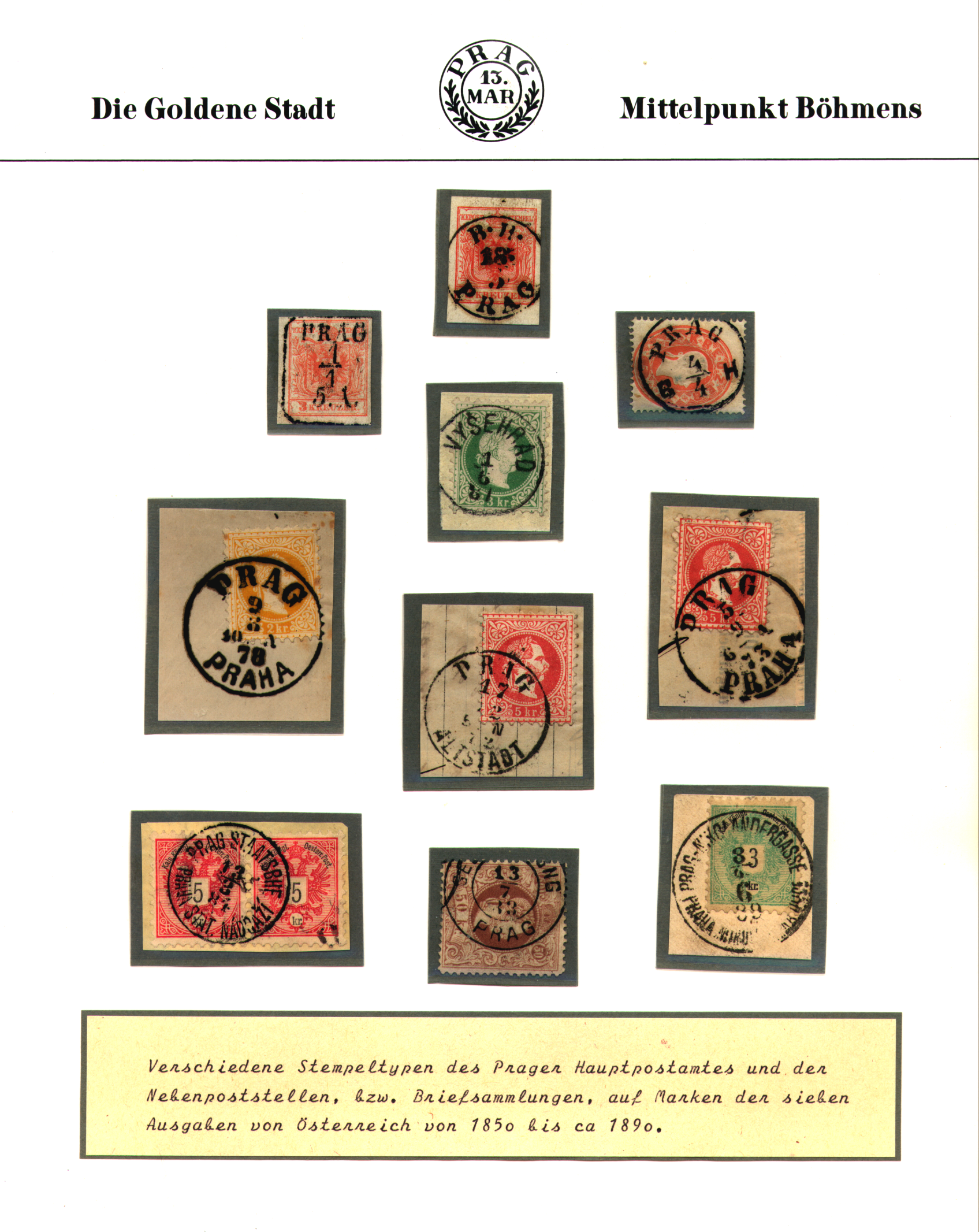
A study of the postmarks of Prague between 1850 and 1888.

Marcophily, occasionally called Marcophilately, is the specialised study and collection of postmarks, cancellations and postal markings applied by hand or machine on mail that passes through a postal system and applied by the postal operator through whose domain they pass. Commatology was a term used prior to World War II but is rarely used today.

Two branches of marcophilists exist - those who are mainly interested in the details, style and design of the markings, and those who take into account the political, social, and postal history surrounding them. Large cities that have many post offices offer great study opportunities due to the vast range of handstamps or machine cancellations in use over any time period. It offers vast study areas to select a topic from for study or collection.

While strictly speaking it is not a postal history topic, it can be collected and studied as such.
