= Postmark =

Mark of the date/time that mail enters postal service custody

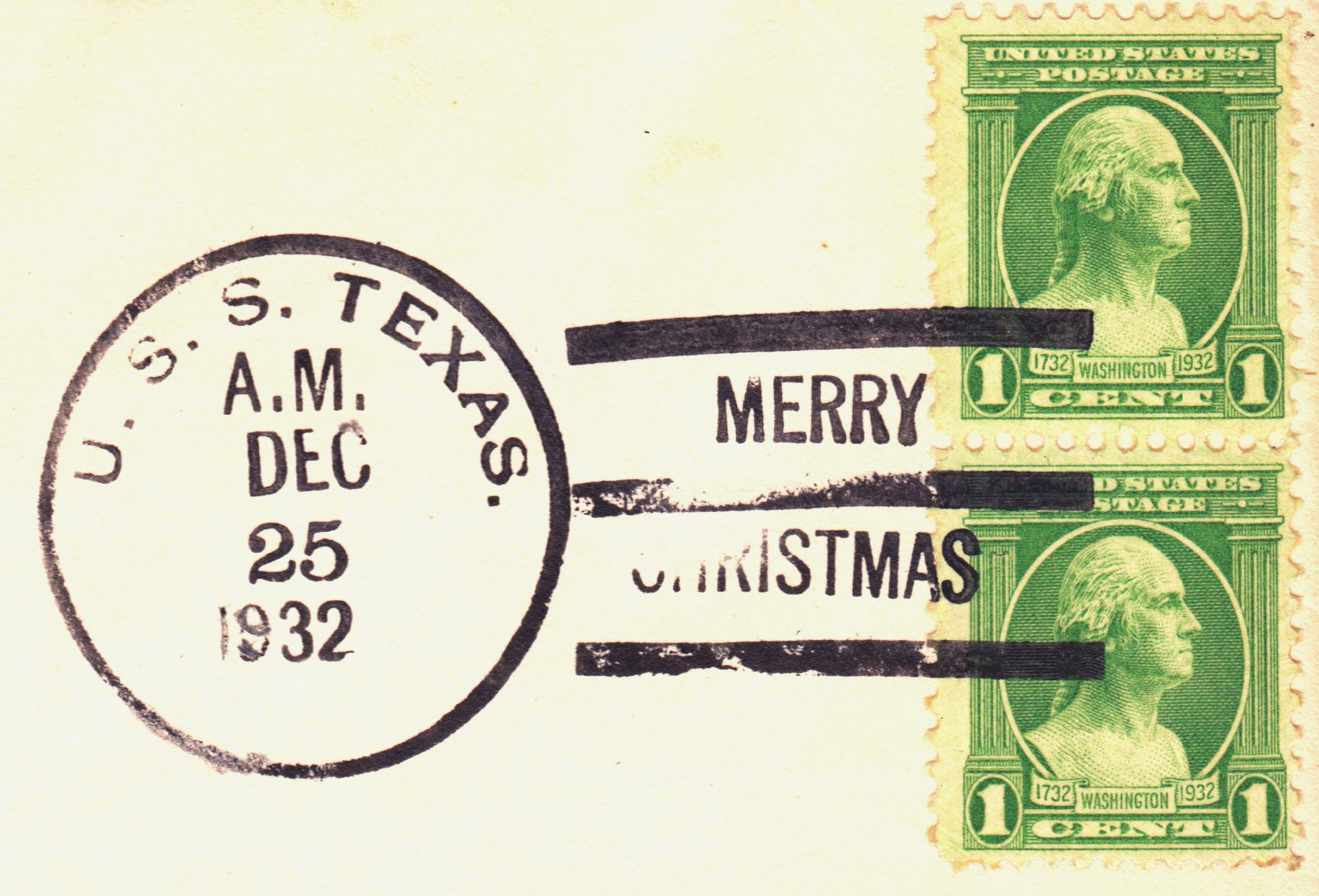
Postmark used on U.S. Navy ship

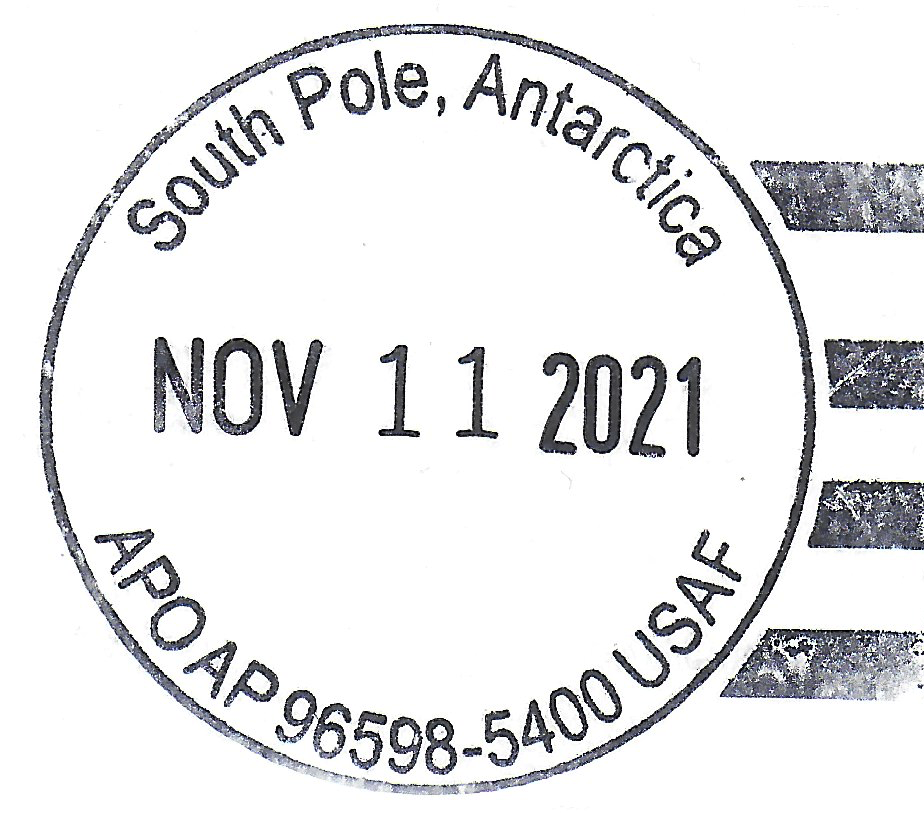
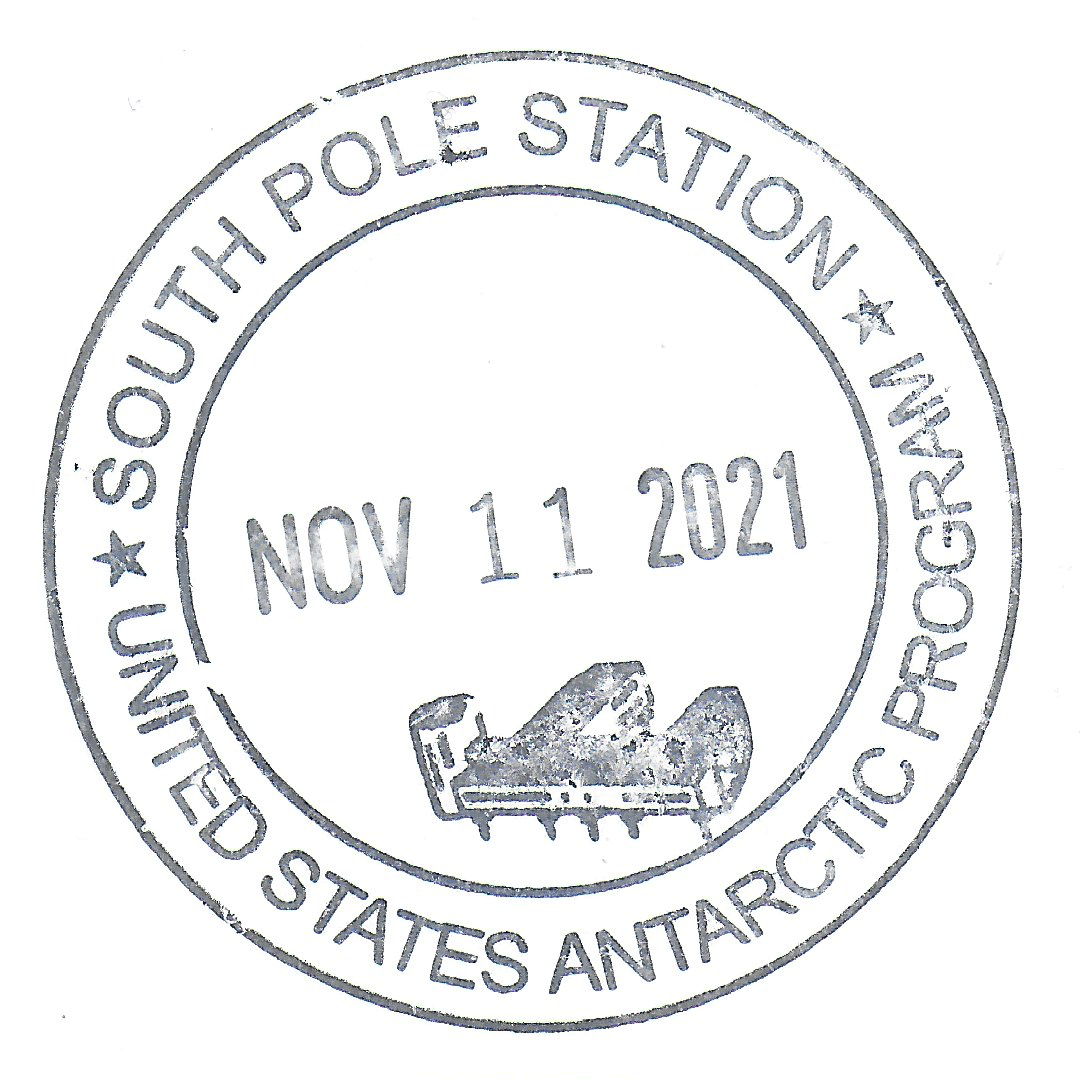
Postmark of the Amundsen–Scott South Pole Station at the South Pole

A postmark is a postal marking made on an envelope, parcel, postcard or the like, indicating the place, date and time that the item was delivered into the care of a postal service, or sometimes indicating where and when received or in transit. Modern postmarks are often applied simultaneously with the cancellation or killer that marks postage stamps as having been used. Sometimes a postmark alone is used to cancel stamps, and the two terms are often used interchangeably. Postmarks may be applied by handstamp or machine, using methods such as rollers or inkjets, while digital postmarks are a recent innovation.

== History ==
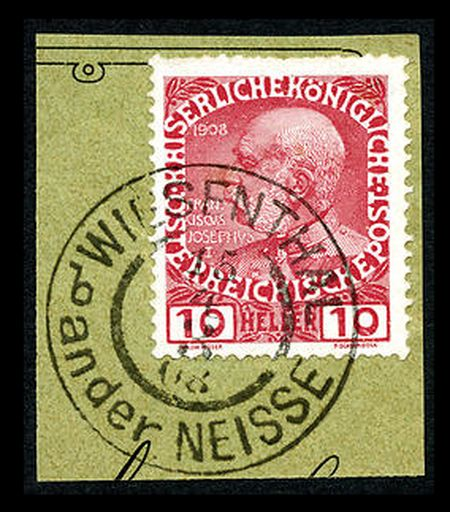
Austrian stamp and postmark

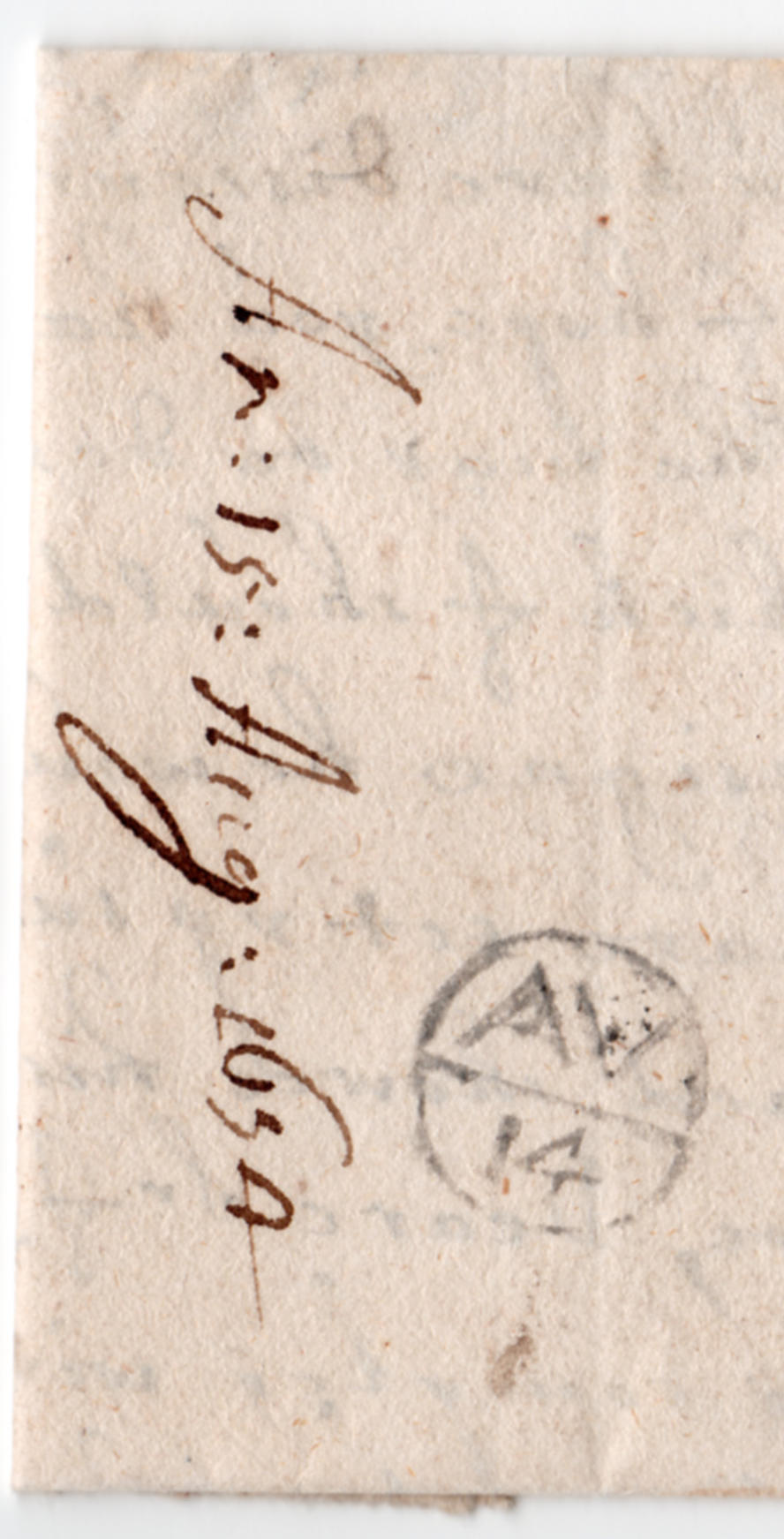
An early example of a Bishop mark.

The first postmark, called the "Bishop mark", was introduced by English Postmaster General Henry Bishop in 1661 and showed only the day and month of mailing to prevent the delay of the mail by carriers.

In England during the latter part of the 17th century, several postmarks were devised for use with the London Penny Post, a postal system that delivered mailed items within the city of London. The postmarks bore the initial of the particular post office or handling house it was sent from along with a separate time stamp. Postage was prepaid and the postmark was applied to the mailed item by means of an inked hand-stamp. Some historians also consider these postmarks to be the world's first postage "stamps".

In the 19th century and early 1900s, it was common for letters to receive multiple postmarks, or backstamps, indicating the time, date, and location of each post office transporting or delivering the letter, and this is still occasionally true. While almost every contemporary postmark includes a location as well as a date, in 2004, New Zealand Post announced plans to eliminate the location on their postmarks and include only the date; however, information about this can be determined by a three-number code on the postmarks.

In Great Britain, the first postmark employed for the cancellation of the then new adhesive postage stamps was the Maltese Cross, so named because of its shape and appearance. This was used in conjunction with a date stamp which was applied, usually to the rear of the letter, which denoted the date of posting.

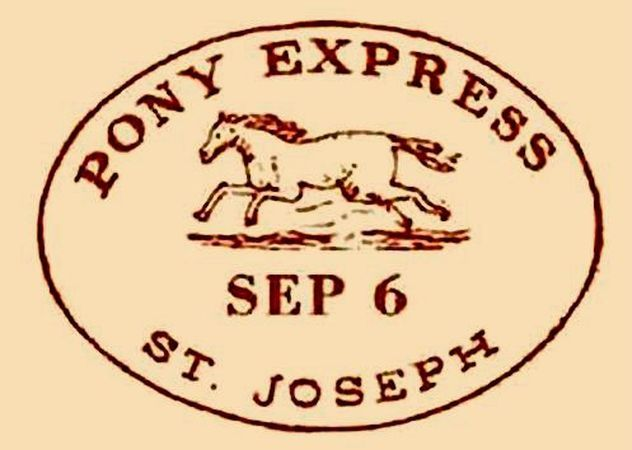
One of several types of postmarks found on Pony Express mail

Different types of postmarks include railway post offices (RPOs) and maritime (on-board ship) postmarks. Postmarks on naval vessels during sensitive operations in wartime are sometimes "clean", showing less information than usual to prevent route of travel or other details from falling into enemy hands. Similar to this is the "censored postmark", overprinted with a black obliteration of the time and place of mailing, for similar reasons.

The Pony Express used a variety of different postmarks on the mail it carried across the Western United States. There are only 250 known examples of surviving Pony Express mail/postmarks in various collections today bearing one of more than a dozen different types of postmarks.

Hawai'i Post, a discontinued personal delivery service, once had a surfboard mail postmark, for covers that traveled by surfboard.

A colour postmark is on the United States Postal Service-issued collectible envelope commemorating the 2004 inauguration of George W. Bush.

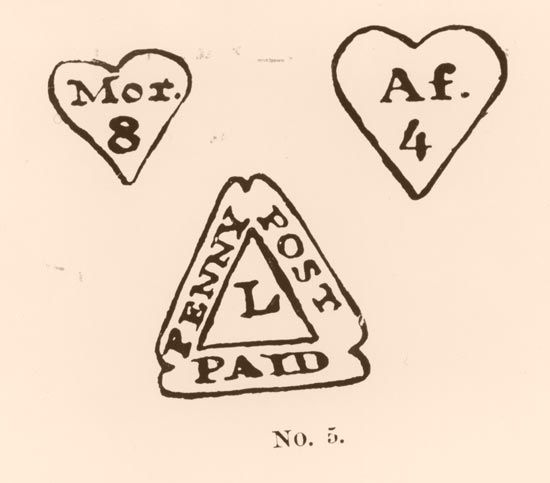
London Penny Post postmark and heart-shaped timestamps

While postmarks are applied almost universally by or under the authority of the official postal department, service, or authority in the United States it is possible to receive "a permit to apply your own postmark", called a Mailer's Postmark Permit, and under certain conditions specified by the private express statutes in the United States, a privately carried letter may be cancelled with a private postmark. Unofficial entities that issue artistamps may use postmark-like markings as well.

Marcophily is the study of postmarks and there are many published work on postmarks covering the topic from before 1900, such as the fancy cancels, until the present day. These include the so-called fancy cancels of the United States to modern machine postmarks.

Fewer postmarks are used now than previously, with the advent of meter labels, some types of computer vended postage, and computerized postage that people can print from their own personal computers (called "PC postage" in the United States, these services have been offered by such companies as Stamps.com and Neopost). These indicia are not always postmarked by the post office but if put into the mailstream later than the date listed on them, they are postmarked about 50% of the time. Because of this, it is a bad idea to try to use the date on one's postage as a postmark.

An official example relating a numismatic item to postmarks occurred on April 13, 1976, when the U.S. issued a new two-dollar bill. People could buy the bills at face value, add a first class stamp (at the time 13 cents), and have the combination postmarked to show they were the first day of issue. Large numbers of these were produced and they remain common.

== Ink colour ==
When the first universal postal system was started in the United Kingdom with its Penny Black, the postmark used red ink for contrast. This was not successful, and the stamp was changed to non-black colours so that the postmark could use black ink.

The majority of postmarks today are in black, with red (particularly in the United States with local post offices' handstamps) following, though sometimes they are in other colours. This is particularly true in the case of pictorial postmarks if the colour in question has some connection to the commemoration.

== Digital postmarks ==
In 2004 the United States Postal Service announced plans to introduce first day digital colour postmarks to be used to cancel some first day covers for commemorative stamps in 2005 and this practice continued and was ongoing as of 2015.

== Postmark advertisement ==
Singapore Post offers a "postmark advertising" service which, strictly speaking, applies to the "killer" rather than the postmark. Hungarian Post Co., Ltd. offers a similar service.

== Unusual postmark techniques ==
There have apparently been some postmarks producing a stereoscopic or "3D" effect where a special viewer is required. They are considered more as a novelty than as a practical postmark. The local post Hawai'i Post had a rubber-stamp postmark, parts of which were hand-painted. At Hideaway Island, Vanuatu, the Underwater Post Office has an embossed postmark.

== Valuation of cancellations ==
The study of postmarks is a specialized branch of philately called marcophily. It may bring added value to the stamps by their historical significance. Other parameters are the rarity and the attractiveness. In particular, the stamps issued by the Empire of Austria during the 1850–1867 period (the 5 issues before the Austro-Hungarian compromise of 1867), are collected for their variety and beauty. More details can be found in Valuation of cancellations of the Austrian Empire.

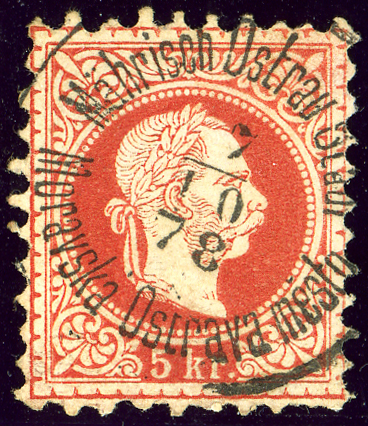
Example of postmark with historical significance: bilingual in the Austrian monarchy Moravia province, 1878

A special or rare postmark can substantially add to the value of a stamp. For example, on a Victorian cover sold at auction for £8,000 in 2019, a Two Penny Blue stamp "was upstaged by" a rare 'sun' date stamp. Also, in addition to everyday postmarks there are postmarks indicating the first day of issue of a particular stamp and pictorial cancellations commemorating local events, anniversaries, and the like' and slogan postmarks which advertise an event or pass information to the public (there has been a recent change to the term "pictorial postmarks" rather than "pictorial cancellations" by the USPS).

There are some examples of "faked covers" produced by philatelic forgers, most usually to increase their value, in which the postmark has been altered in some way; for example, by changing the date.

== Practical uses ==
The postmark is often considered as an official confirmation that a cover (letter, packet, etc.) mailed item was mailed at a given location at a specific date. For example, the date of the postmark can be quite important. In the United States, the Internal Revenue Service will still consider income tax returns as filed on time though it receives them late if they are postmarked on time, and this date (with, perhaps, other proof of mailing), may have significance in the context of legal filings and proofs of service or of delivery (though in this case the date may viewed as "on time" if the date of the postmark is no more than one day after the date service is supposed to have been made). Postal voting ballots may be accepted in some places if postmarked by the date of the election, though other places require receipt by a certain deadline. Historically, postmarks, known as backstamps were also applied to the reverse side of a cover to confirm arrival at the post office on a specific date.

== Delivery postmarks ==
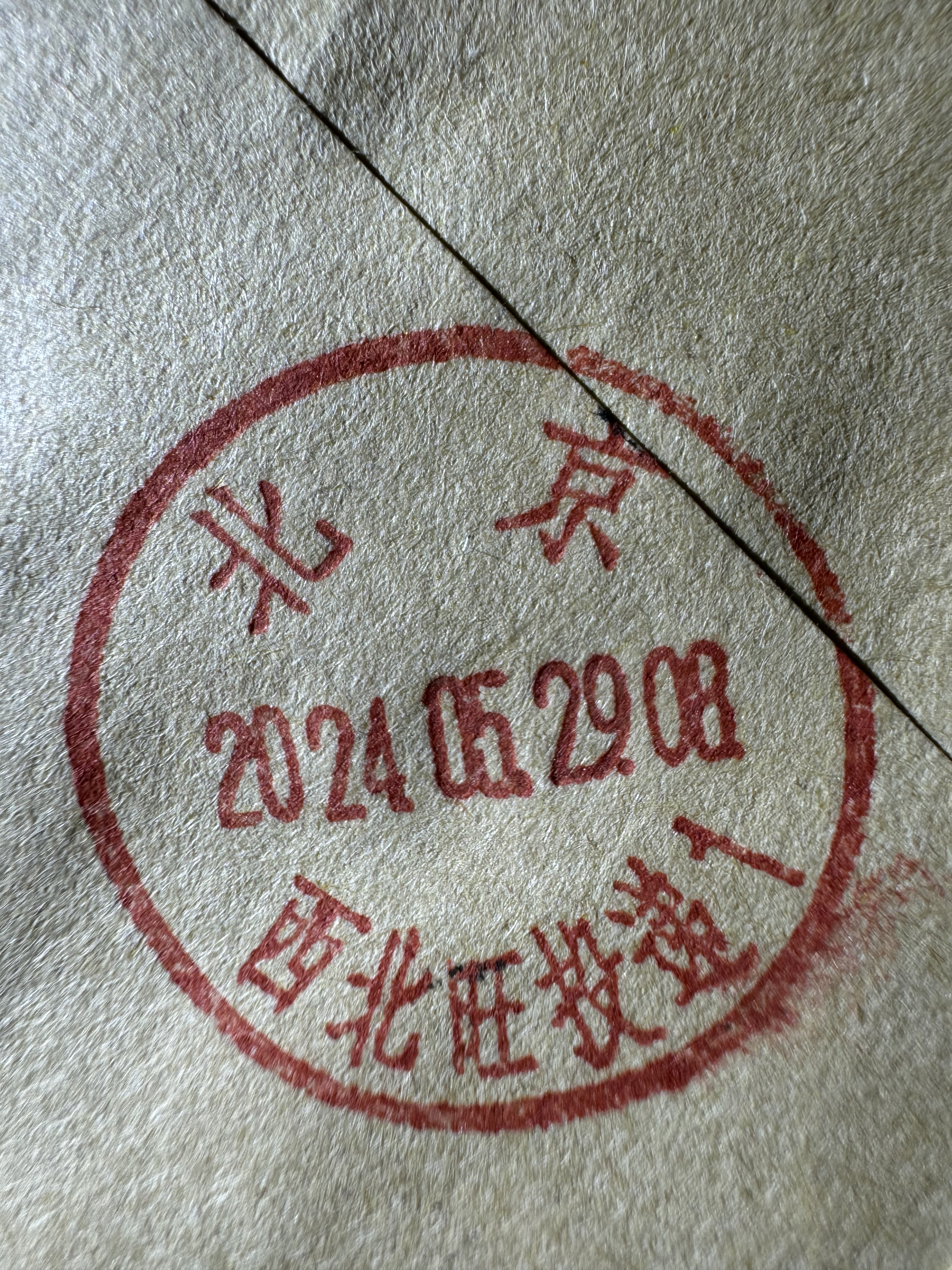
China Post "delivery postmark" in Beijing, China, on 29 May 2024

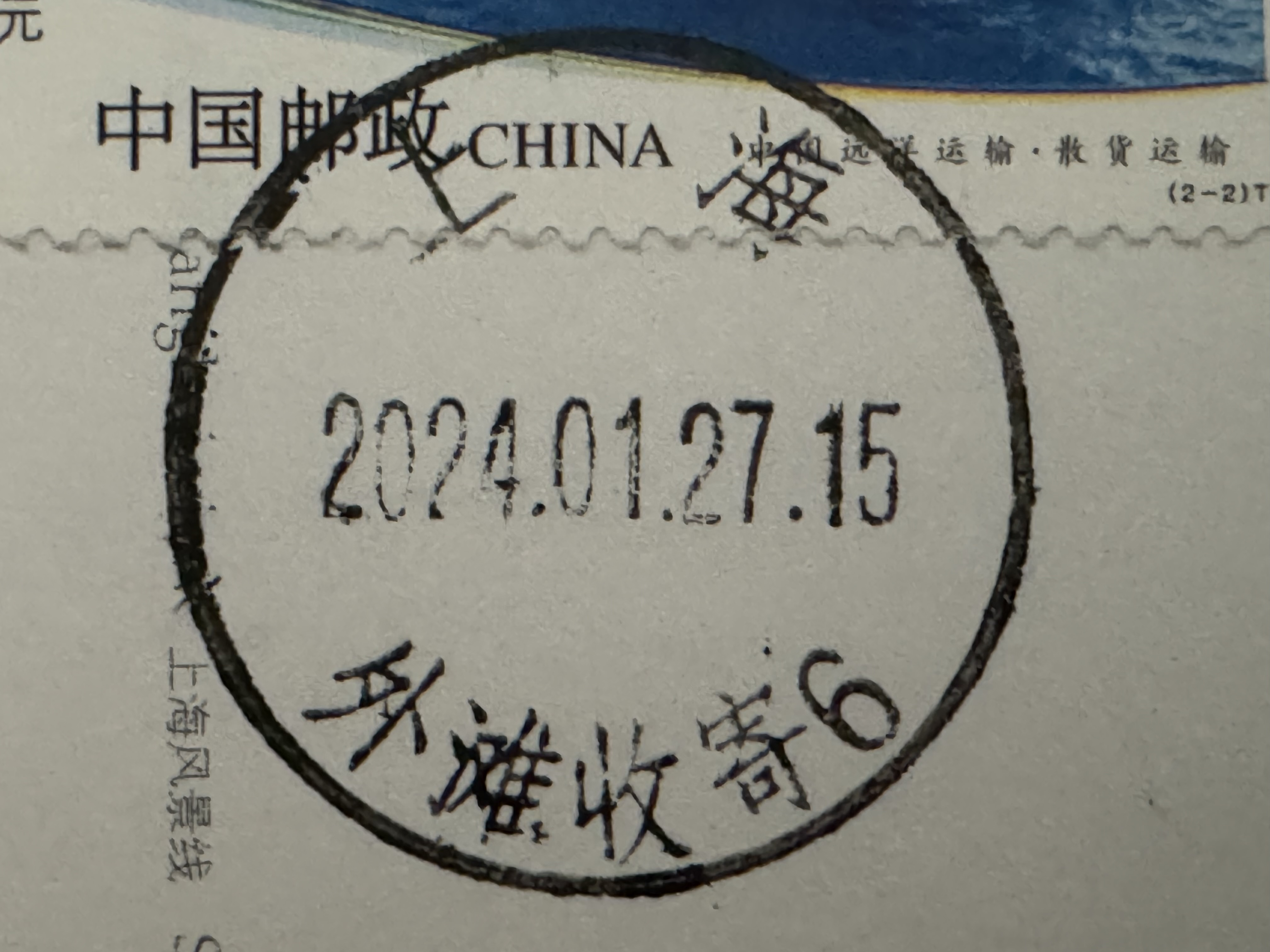
China Post "posting postmark" in Shanghai, China, on 27 January 2024

China Post distinguishes delivery postmarks from posting postmarks. When a letter or a postcard is accepted into the care of a postal service, a black postmark is applied on the postage stamp, known as the "posting postmark" (Chinese: 收寄日戳). When a letter or a postcard is delivered, a red postmark is applied on the back side of the envelope or a blank region of the postcard, known as the "delivery postmark" (Chinese: 投递日戳).

== Similar marks ==
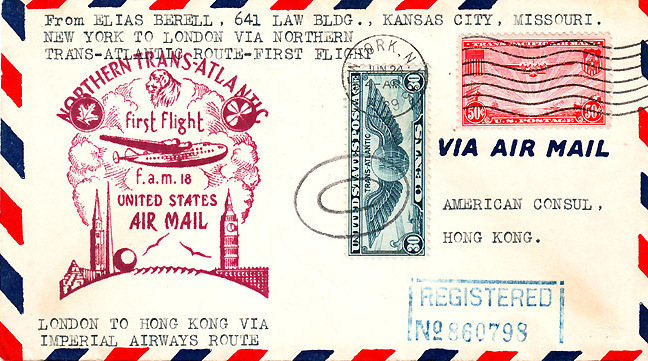
1939 Around the World flight with red flight cachet

A postmark should not be confused with the killer which are lines, bars, etc. used to cancel a postage stamp. The killer acts as the cancellation, though the postmark can also serve this purpose. Neither should a postmark be confused with overprints generally, or pre-cancels (stamps that have been cancelled before the envelope or package to which they are affixed is submitted or deposited for acceptance into the mailstream, they most commonly have taken the form of a pre-printed city name on the stamp) specifically, which generally do not indicate a date.

Flight cachets, more or less elaborate rubber-stamps on an envelope indicating on which flight (typically a first flight), a first flight cover has traveled via airmail, are in addition to the postmark and are not postmarks either.

== Clubs ==
There are many clubs devoted to the hobby of collecting postmarks. One of those clubs is the Post Mark Collector's Club, founded in 1946 and based in the USA. Another is the British Postmark Society, founded in 1958.

== See also ==
- Indicia (philately)
- Postal marking
- Postal history
