= Dallay =

French philatelic

Dallay is a French philatelic editor established in Paris. Dallay has published stamp catalogs since 2001.

The catalogs list postage stamps issued by France and other francophone areas: metropolitan France, French overseas territories, French post in Andorra and Monaco. In late 2005, Dallay published a catalog for the French former colonial empire.

The catalogs provide detailed information about the stamps, such as, stamp designers' names, postal use at the time of issue, etc.

In 2004, Dallay was convicted by a court of justice of forgery and unfair competition for the use of Yvert numbering system which was first used in 1895. In March 2005, after arbitration by the French Conseil de la Concurrence (Competition Commission), Yvert et Tellier began to license the right to print an index of Yvert stamp numbers at the back of competitors' catalogs. Dallay began using the index starting with the 2005-2006 edition.
