= Postage stamps and postal history of Madagascar =

This is a survey of the postage stamps and postal history of Madagascar, briefly also known as Malagasy.

Madagascar is an island nation in the Indian Ocean off the southeastern coast of Africa. The main island, also called Madagascar, is the fourth-largest island in the world.

== First stamps ==
The first stamps used in Madagascar were general issues for the French Colonies. In 1889 the French colonial general issues were overprinted with new face values.

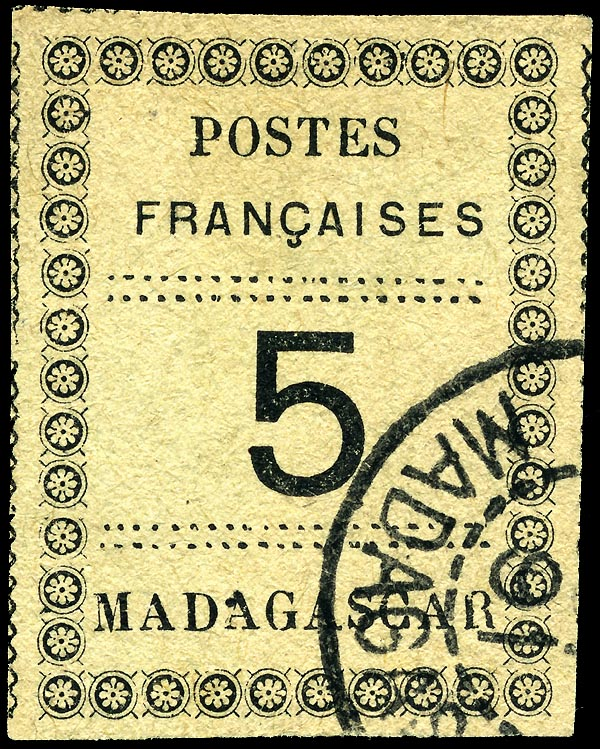
The 1891 issue

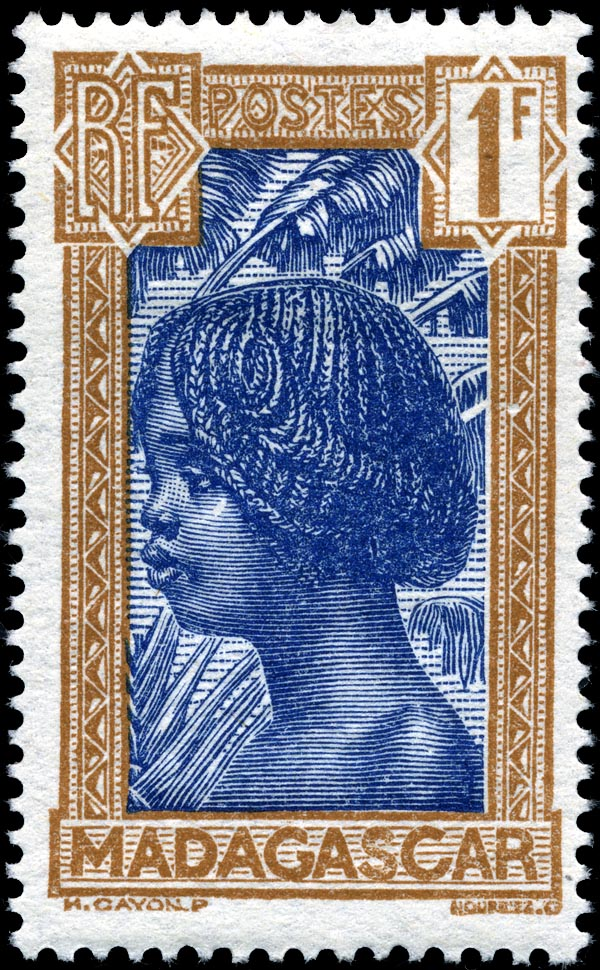
A 1930 stamp of Madagascar

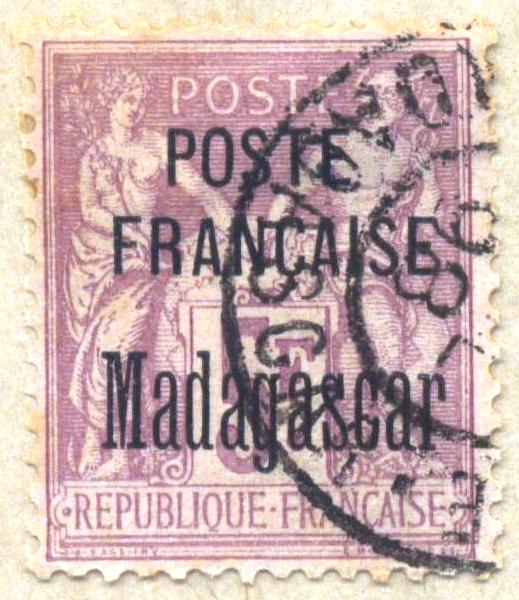
French stamp overprinted for use in Madagascar, 1895

The 1891 issue was printed locally on sheetlets of 10 stamps. The hand preparation of the die meant that each of the 10 positions had its own identifying traits. The differences usually pertain to the number of dots (points) in the two rows above and below the value. A quick count of the dots in the two pair of rows will usually discern the type, as well as indicate forgeries.

The first set of definitives was issued in 1896. From 1912 to 1950, Madagascar stamps were also used in the Comoros.

== Independence ==
The Malagasy Republic was proclaimed on 14 October 1958, as an autonomous state within the French Community, and attained full independence on 26 June 1960.. The first stamps of the republic were issued in December 1958. Paositra Malagasy is the postal service provider. The country was renamed the Democratic Republic of Madagascar in 1975.

== Nossi-Be issues ==
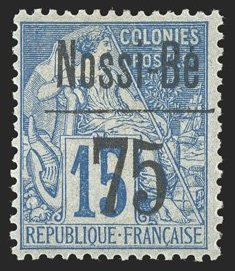
French colonial general issue overprinted for Nossi-Be, 1893

Nossi-Bé is an island off the western coast of Madagascar which became a French colony in 1841. Stamps were issued for Nossi-Bé from 1889 to 1894.

== Sainte Marie de Madagascar issues ==
Sainte Marie de Madagascar is an island off the eastern coast of Madagascar ceded to the French in 1750. Stamps were issued for Sainte Marie de Madagascar in 1894.

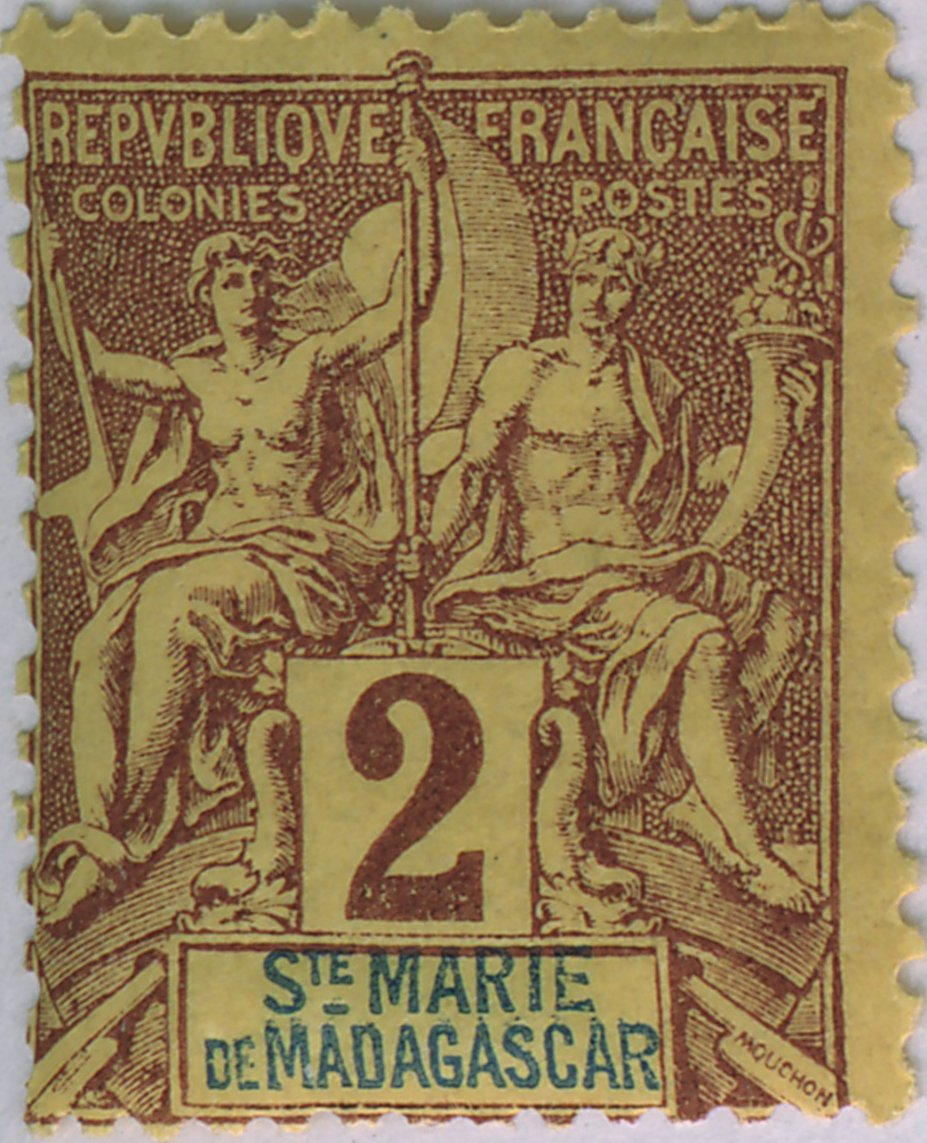
An 1894 stamp of St. Marie de Madagascar

== Diego-Suárez issues ==
Diego-Suárez, a city at the northern tip of Madagascar in Antsiranana province, issued its own postage stamps from 1890 to 1894.

== British posts ==
British interests in Madagascar organised two different posts on the island.

A runner service between Tananarive and the French Post Office at Tamatave was organised by British residents before 1884. It was made official by the British Vice Consul in 1884. It used locally produced stamps between 1884 and 1897 after which stamps were discontinued but the service continued with handstruck marks.

During the French war of occupation the British ran an inland postal service using special stamps between January and September 1895. This was not an official service of the British Post Office.

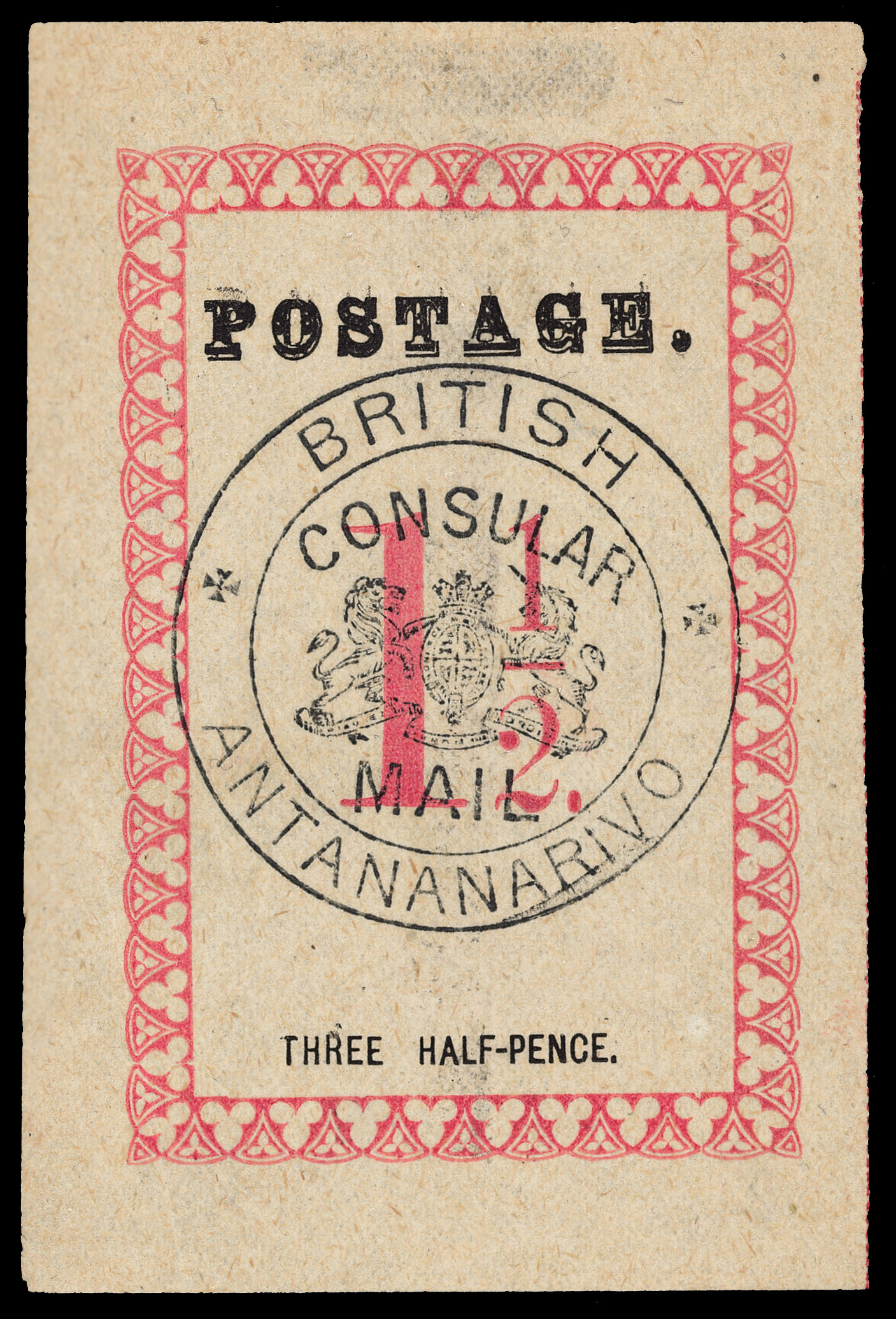
A stamp of the earlier British post in Madagascar supported by the British Vice Consul

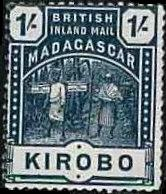
Stamps from the 1895 British inland postal service

== See also ==
- Postage stamps and postal history of Diego-Suárez
- Postage stamps and postal history of the Comoros
