= L'Écho de la timbrologie =

French monthly philatelic magazine

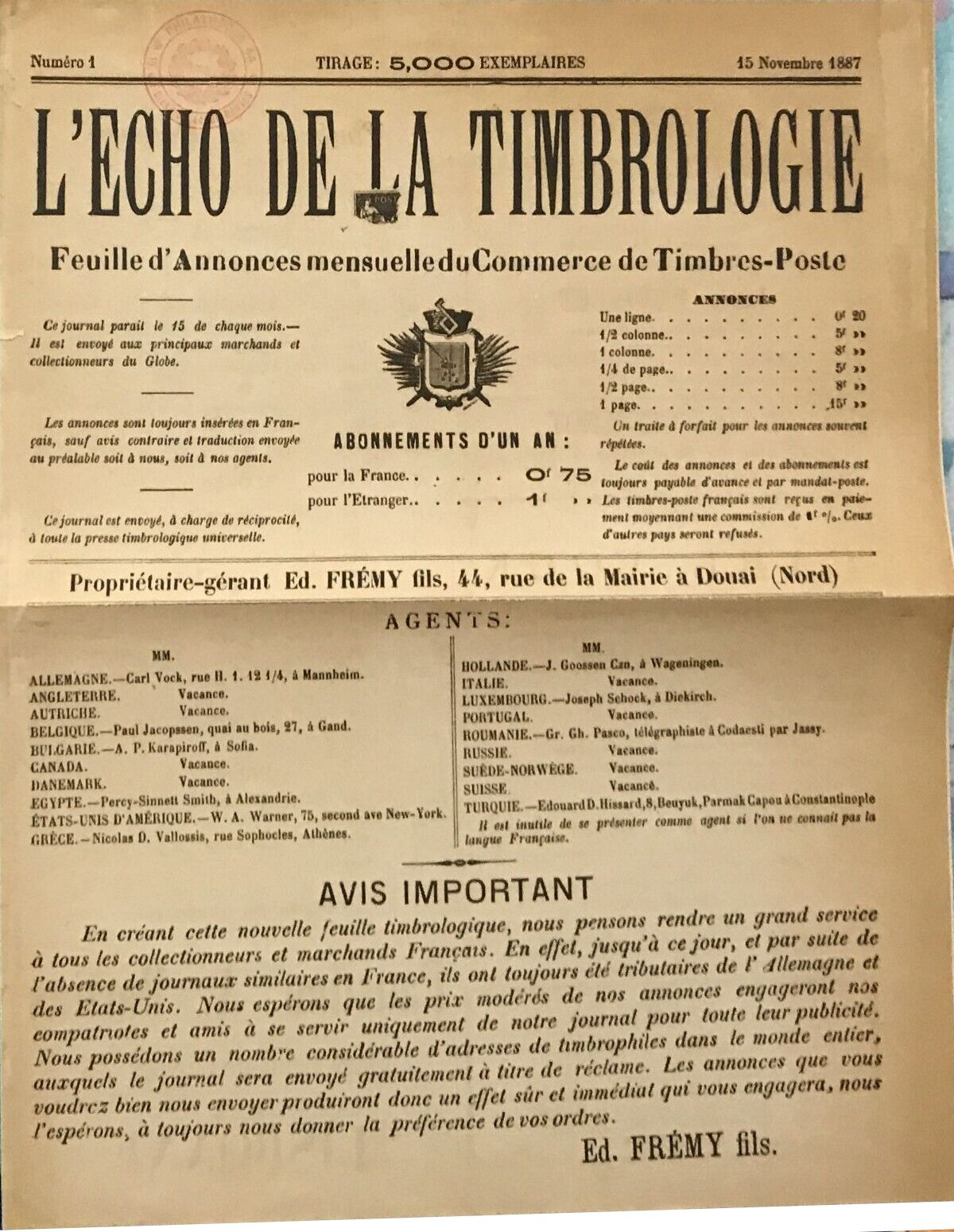
First issue of L'Écho de la timbrologie dated 15 November 1887

L'Écho de la timbrologie is a French monthly magazine about philately and stamp collecting. First published in 1887, it is the French oldest surviving philatelic publication. Its subtitle is "La tribune des philatélistes" (the philatelists' tribune).

First published on 15 November 1887 by Edmond Frémy, a philatelist of Douai in Northern France. In 1890, his health forced him to let the magazine to printer and stamp collector Théodule Tellier, whose printing plant Yvert had been L'Écho's printer.

In 1895, when Louis Yvert, Tellier's associate, decided to give all his entrepreneur's energy to philately, he became the editor-in-chief of L'Écho de la timbrologie and his descendants ruled the publications too; his son Pierre Yvert in the 1930s, his grandson Jean Yvert in 1955, and Benoît Gervais since the 1990s.

At the end of the 20th and the beginning of the 21st century, it is published by an Amiens-based company where Yvert et Tellier prints the magazine. Its editorial staff works in Paris.

With Timbres magazine, founded in 2000, L'Écho de la timbrologie is one of the two main French philatelic publications.

Since 1996, a weekly philatelic paper, Atouts timbres, is published by the same company. Printed mainly in black and white, it is mainly aimed at a younger audience than L'Écho, but has finally been adopted by established collectors.

== Sources and references ==
- (1996) Yvert et Tellier. Cent ans d'histoire. Amiens, France, Yvert et Tellier.
