= Cancellation (mail) =

Postal marking to deface a stamp and prevent its re-use

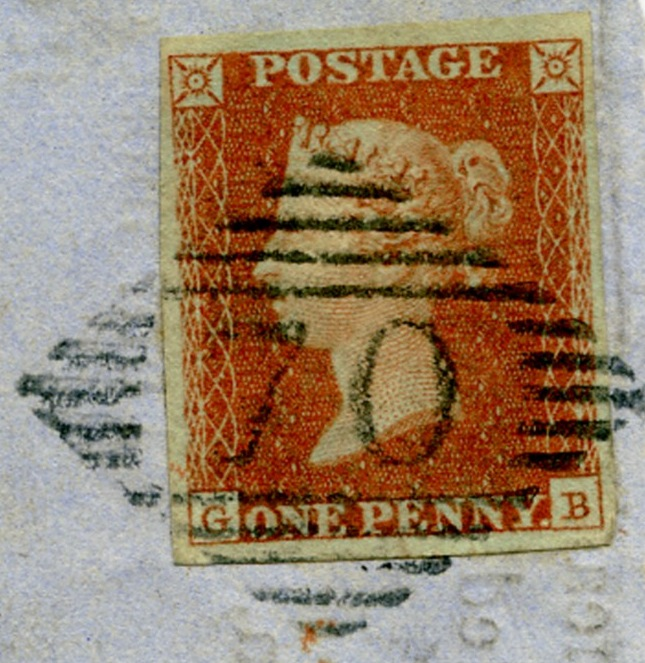
Numeral 70 identifying Boyle, diamond bars for Ireland

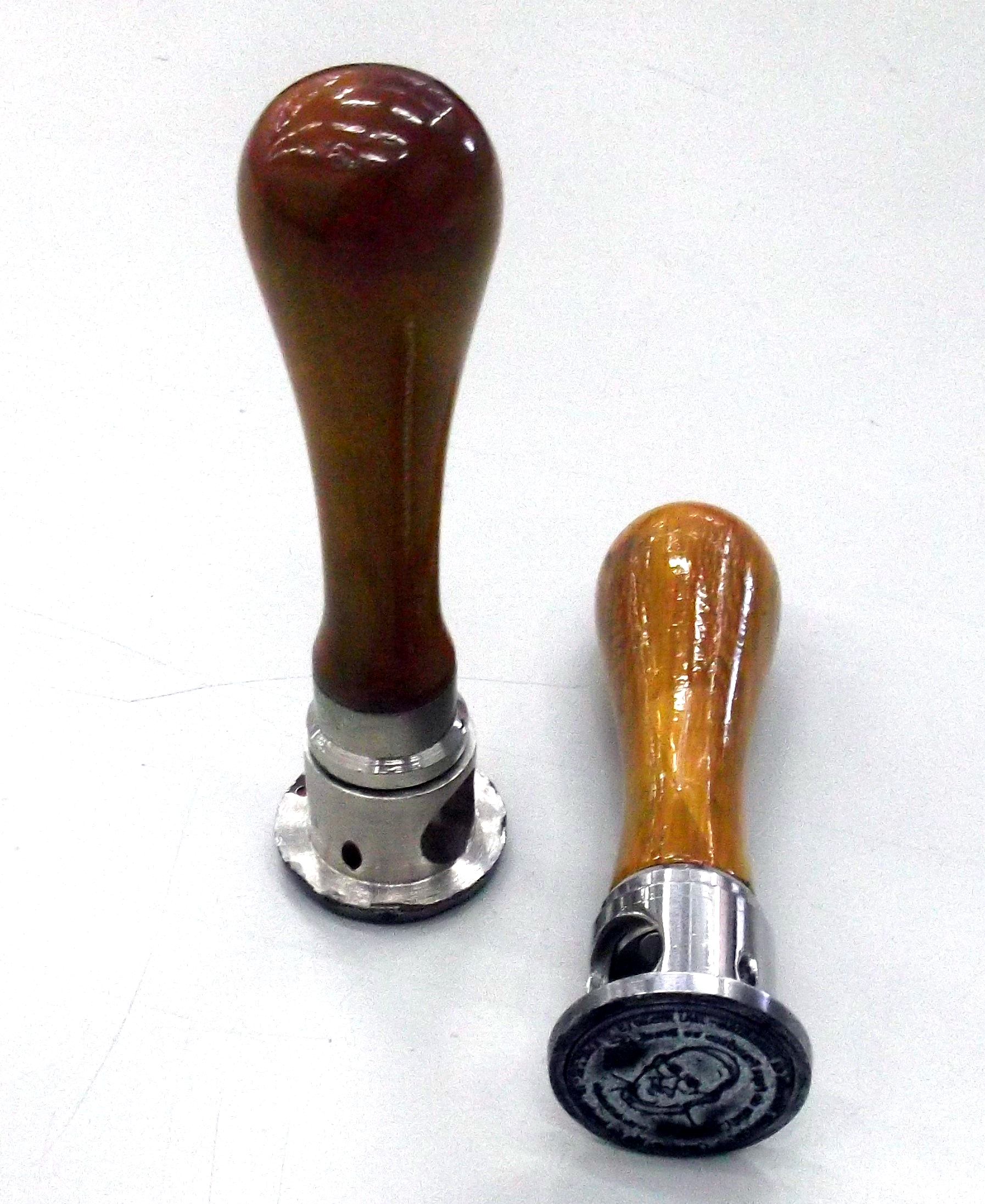
Hand stamp of the type used to cancel postage stamps

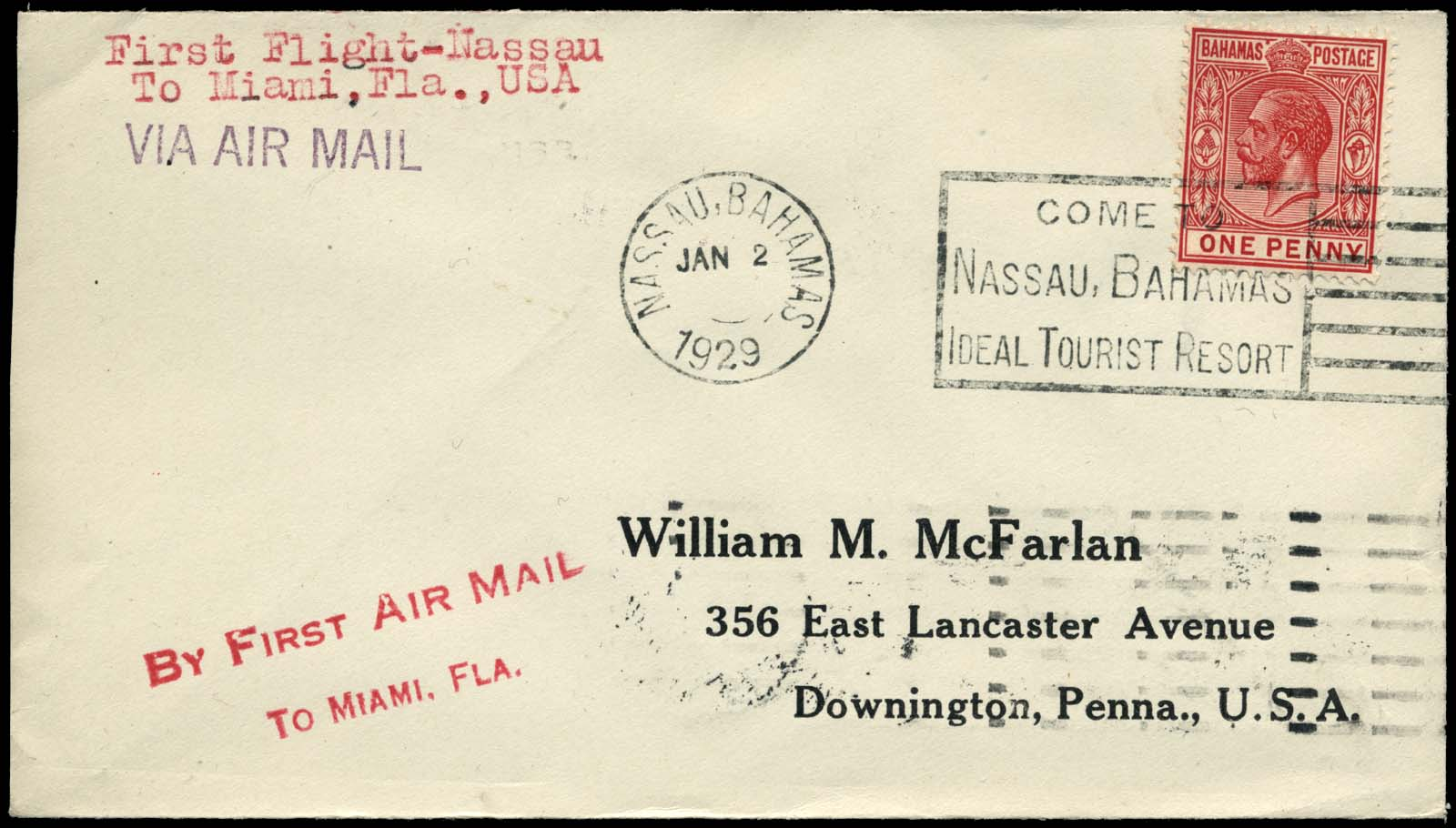
1929 machine cancellation used to cancel 1d stamp on first flight cover from Nassau to Miami

A cancellation (or cancel for short; French: oblitération) is a postal marking applied on a postage stamp or postal stationery to deface the stamp and to prevent its reuse. Cancellations come in a huge variety of designs, shapes, sizes, and colors. Modern cancellations commonly include the date and post office location where the stamps were mailed, in addition to lines or bars designed to cover the stamp itself. The term "postmark" refers specifically to the part that contains the date and posting location, but the term is often used interchangeably with "cancellation" as it may serve that purpose. The portion of a cancellation that is designed to deface the stamp and does not contain writing is also called the "obliteration" or killer. Some stamps are issued pre-cancelled with a printed or stamped cancellation and do not need to have a cancellation added.

== History ==
The first adhesive postage stamp was the Penny Black, issued in 1840 by Great Britain. The postal authorities recognized there must be a method for preventing reuse of the stamps and simultaneously issued handstamps for use to apply cancellations to the stamps on the envelopes as they passed through the postal system. The cancels were handmade and depicted a Maltese cross design. Initially, the ink used was red, but it was found that this could be cleaned off and the stamps reused, and so after a series of experiments, early in 1841 black cancelling ink was used, which was more permanent. The color of the stamps was also changed to red-brown so as to ensure that the cancellation showed clearly.

Britain soon abandoned the Maltese crosses and in 1844 began to employ cancellations displaying numbers which referred to the location of mailing. A similar scheme was used for British stamps used abroad in its colonies and foreign postal services, with locations being assigned a specific letter followed by a number, such as A01 used in Kingston, Jamaica, or D22 for Venezuela.

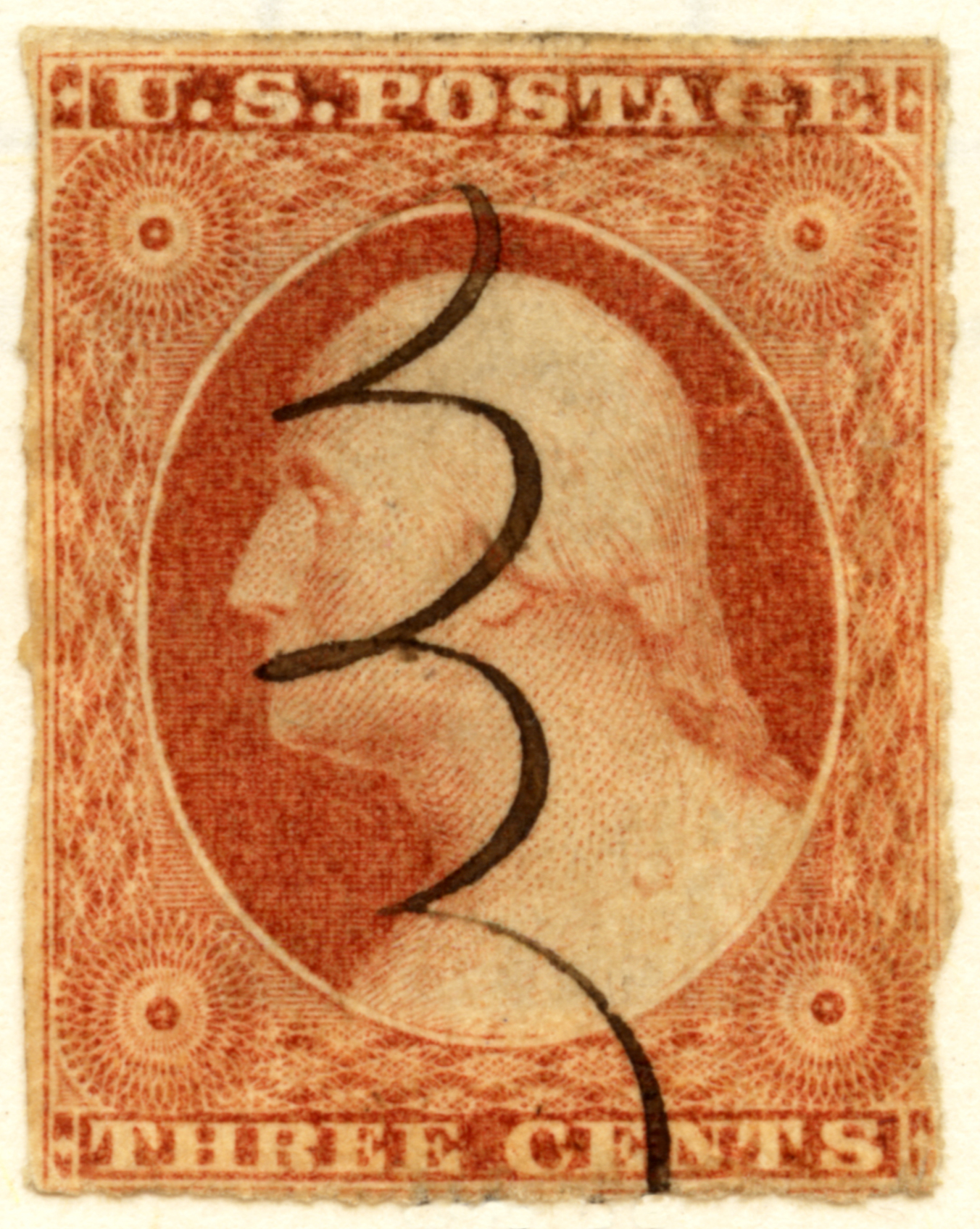
An 1851 U.S. stamp with a pen cancellation

Early cancellations were all applied by hand, commonly using hand stamps. Where hand stamps were not available, stamps often were cancelled by marking over the stamp with pen, such as writing an "x". Pen cancellations were used in the United States into the 1880s, and in a sense continue to this day, when a postal clerk notices a stamp has escaped cancellation and marks it with a ball point pen or marker.

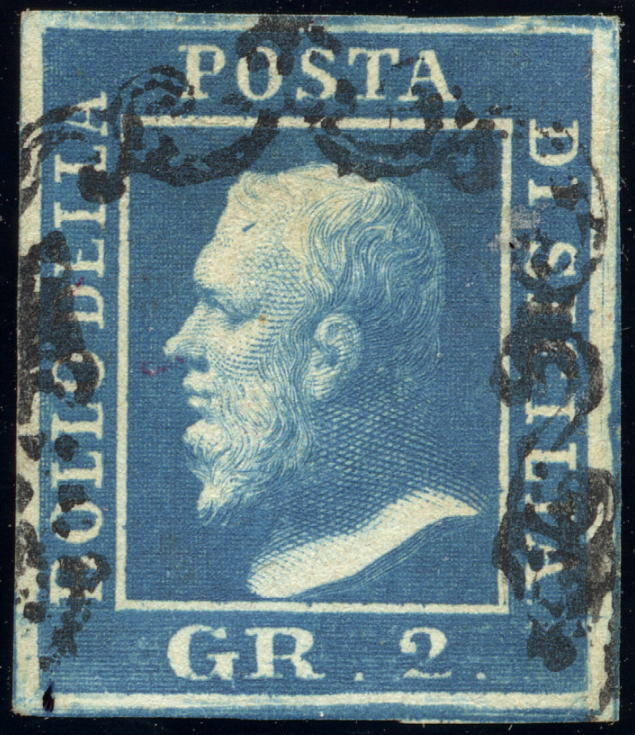
1859 stamp of Sicily with deferential cancellation designed not to deface the "sacred image" of King Ferdinand II

In the early period of the issuance of postage stamps in the United States a number of patents were issued for cancelling devices or machines that increased (or were purported to increase) the difficulty of washing off and reusing postage stamps. These methods generally involved the scraping or cutting-away of part of the stamp, or perhaps punching a hole through its middle. (These forms of cancellation must be distinguished from perfins, a series of small holes punched in stamps, typically by private companies as an anti-theft device.)

High speed cancellation machines were first used in Boston between 1880–1890 and subsequently throughout the country.

Today, cancellations may either be applied by hand or machine. Hand cancellation is often used when sending unusually shaped mail or formal mail (e.g., wedding invitations) to avoid damage caused by machine cancellation.

Postal meter stamps and similar modern printed to order stamps are not ordinarily cancelled by postal authorities because such stamps bear the date produced and can not readily be re-used.

== Types of cancellations ==
- Bullseye cancellation, also called "Socked on the nose" or SOTN, is a stamp collector's term for a cancellation, typically of circular design, centered on the postage stamp. Such cancellations are popular with some stamp collectors because of their neatness and the fact that the time, date, and location where the stamp was used may be readily seen. The prevalence of bulls-eye cancellations varies considerably by country and time period.
- Cancelled-to-order. Cancelled-to-order stamps, also known as CTOs, are stamps that have been cancelled by a postal authority, but were never used to transmit mail. CTOs are created by postal authorities to sell the stamps cheaply to stamp collectors. Many Eastern European countries and others sold great numbers of CTOs to collectors in the 1950s–1990s strictly for revenue. CTOs often may be identified as the stamps still retain their original gum. Some authorities use the same canceller for all CTOs, and apply it very neatly in the corner of four stamps at one time. In some instances, the "cancellations" are actually printed as part of the stamp itself.
- Deferential cancellation is a cancellation designed so as not to deface the image of the ruler or regent on the stamp.

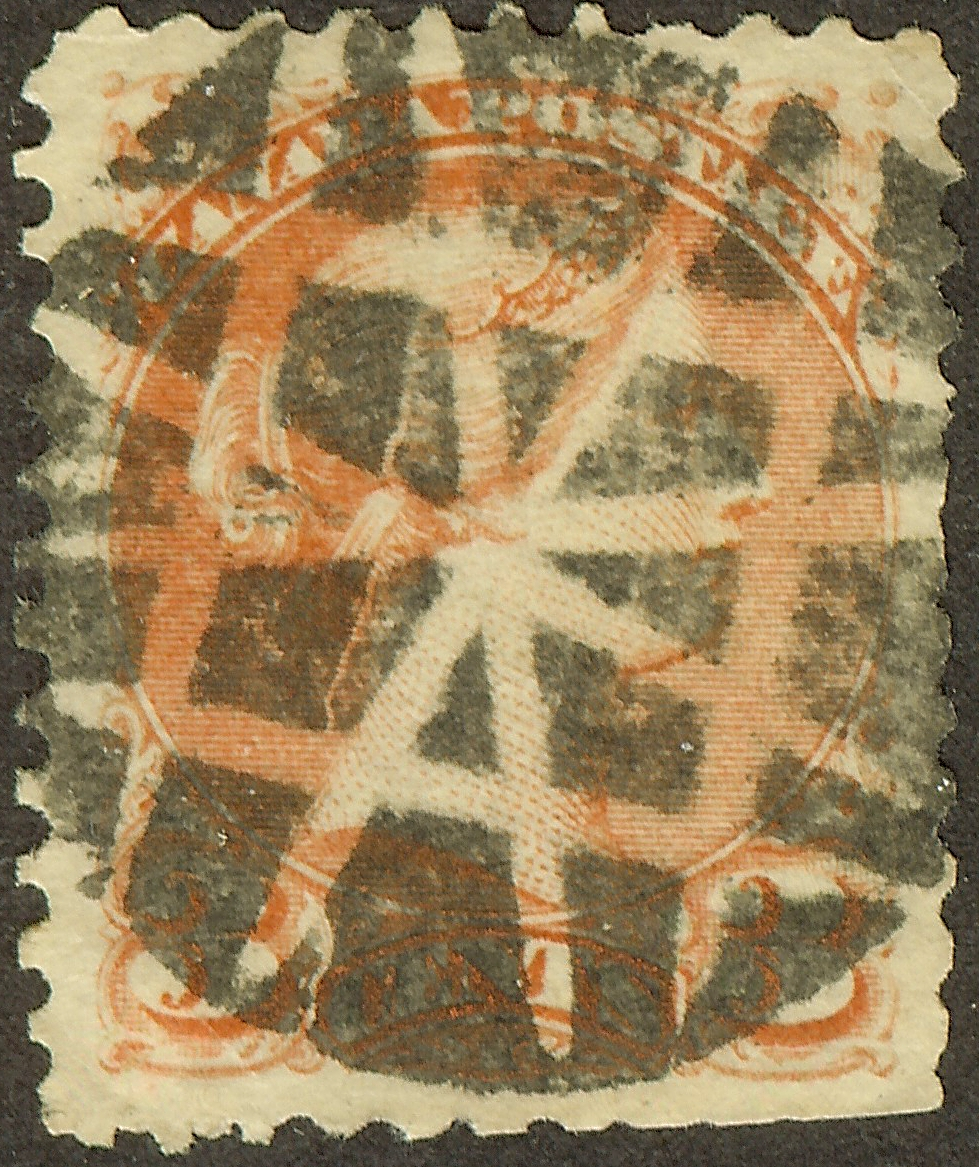
Fancy cancel on 1872 Canada stamp

- A duplex cancel includes a postmark as well as the cancellation.
- Fancy cancels. In the second half of the 19th century, many postmasters in the United States and Canada cut their own cancelers from cork or wood in a great variety of designs such as stars, circles, flags, chickens, etc. These are known as fancy cancels and have been heavily studied by philatelists and collectors. One of the most famous is the "kicking mule" used in the 1880s.
- First day of issue are special cancellations with the date the stamp is first issued for sale and include the words "First day of issue."
- Flag cancellations are a type of machine cancellation incorporating a design of the United States flag with the stripes serving as the "killer". The first machine flag cancel (preceded by fancy cancels of flags) was used in Boston in November–December 1894.
- Handstamped cancellations are cancellations added by means of a hand stamping device.
- Highway post office cancels refers to cancels added in transit by portable mail-handling equipment for sorting mail in trucks.
- Machine cancellations are automatically added by machines that rapidly process large numbers of envelopes. A 1903 silent film of an operating cancelling machine may be seen here.
- Mute cancel refers to a cancellation that includes no writing and thus "does not speak."
- Numeral cancels are cancels whereby number were used to identify specific post offices. For the United Kingdom of Great Britain and Ireland, which started using numerals in 1844, the shape of bars indicate the actual country of use. Numerals were also used in combination with a datestamp in duplex cancellations.
- Pen cancels refer to the use of a writing pen to deface the stamp, and were more common in the 19th and early 20th centuries.
- Pictorial cancellations include images associated with the commemoration of some event or anniversary. Some people attempt to use stamps relating to the theme of a pictorial cancellation on the envelope. See further below.

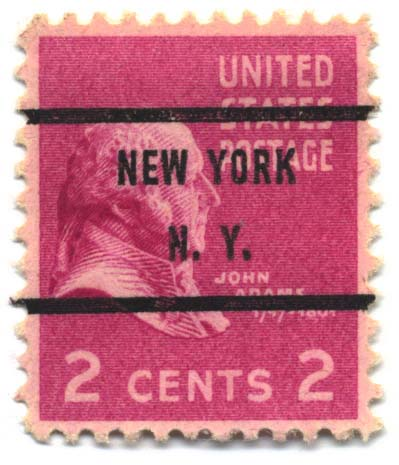
U.S. 1938 precancelled stamp

- Precancels are stamps that have been issued with printed cancellations on them, typically to mass mailers. Precancels cannot normally be used by the general public.
- Railway post office (R.P.O.) cancels refer to cancellations applied on mail sorted on trains. The first United States cancellation with the word "railroad" dates from 1838. The last Railway Post Office (R.P.O.) operated by the United States closed in 1977.
- Ship cancels were added to stamps that were mailed on or carried on a ship, commonly a steamer ship in the late 19th–early 20th centuries. In French, the cancellation reads "Paquebot".
- Slogan cancellations contain a slogan, perhaps commemorative or advertising, in the killer box. See further below.

== Pictorial and special cancellations ==
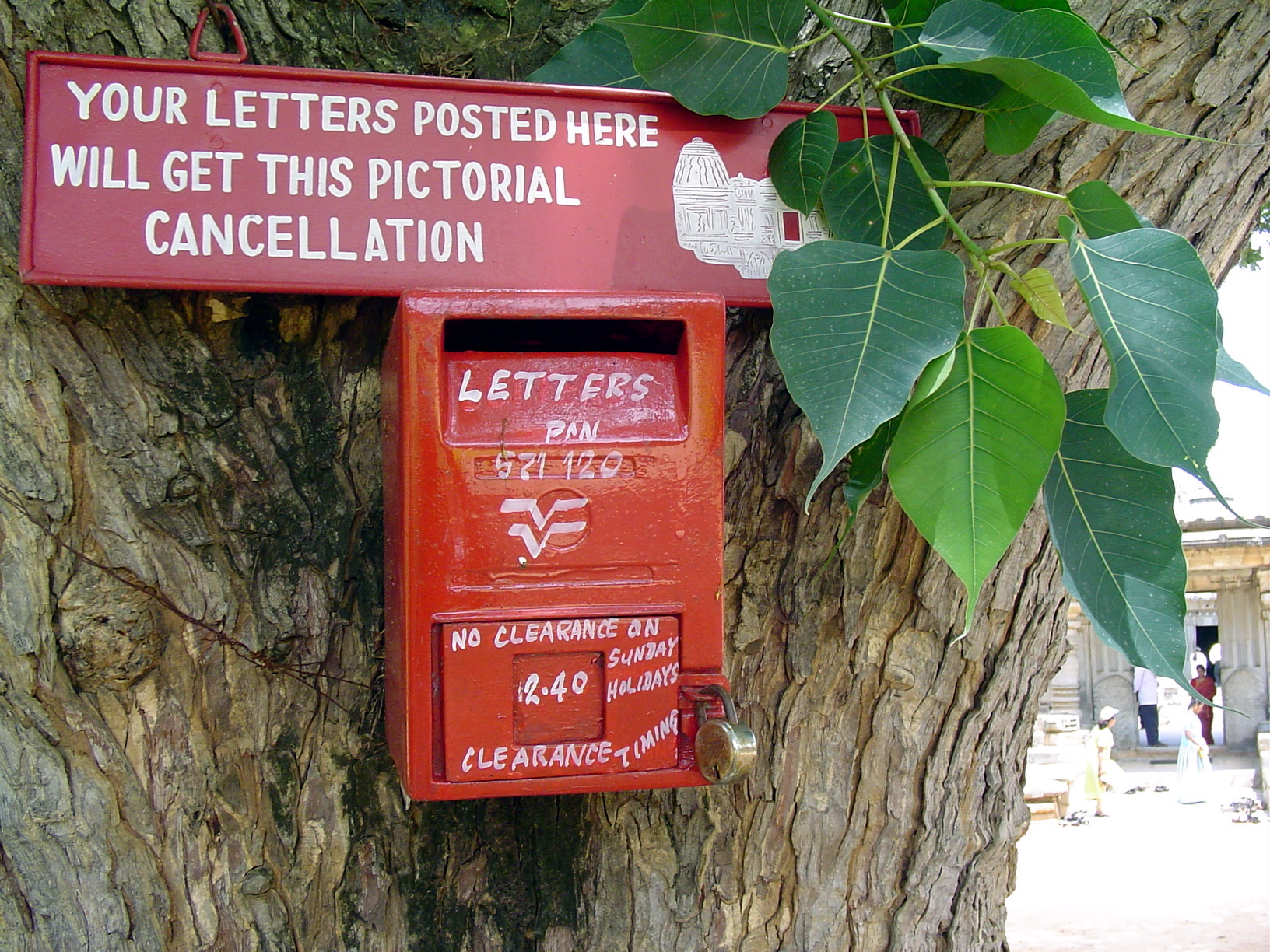
This post box is located at a historical site Somnathpur in Karnataka, India. Letters posted in this box will receive a pictorial cancellation with an image of the Kesava temple.

The United States Postal Service distinguishes between special cancellations which have a caption publicizing an event, and pictorial cancellations, which contain an image of some sort. Special cancellations are essentially a type of slogan cancellations. The USPS Building Bridges Special Postal Cancellation Series, a unique series that began in 1996, combines both a pictorial drawing and an event slogan in what USPS refers to as a cancellation series, even though it also contains a pictorial element.

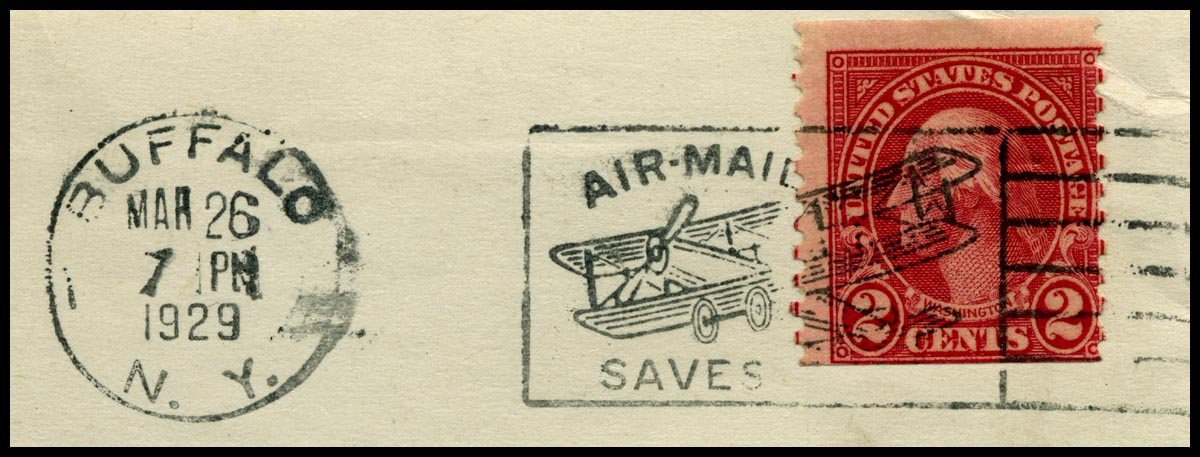
A 1929 pictorial cancellation promoting the use of airmail

In the United States, official pictorial cancellations are almost invariably applied at special "stations", i.e., post offices existing only for a limited time, usually one day, at special events, although there are frequently other pictorial cancellations that are not officially described as such—they are among what are called special cancellations and are special die-hubs added to machine cancels, which usually contain merely a slogan but sometimes contain a picture. There are a very few exceptions in which a particular post office uses a pictorial cancellation on all its mail. The range of allowable subjects is very broad, and may include a variety of commercial tie-ins, such as to movie characters.

Canada Post uses automated cancellations with computer-printed messaging. In this way, the corporation can automatically print promotional messages on each envelope while simultaneously cancelling the piece of mail. Messages change throughout the year, and include seasonal messages ("Merry Christmas / Joyeux Noel") and promotional messages (such as Canada Post's web address).

Other post offices such as the Isle of Man Philatelic Bureau also create special pictorial cancellations as they did in 1985 to mark the anniversary of the aircraft Douglas DC-3. A special handstamp was created depicting a Dakota flying "free" and not "boxed in".

== Collectors ==
Cancellations can affect the value of stamps to collectors, positively or negatively. Cancellations of some countries have been extensively studied by philatelists, and many stamp collectors and postal history collectors collect cancellations in addition to the stamps themselves.

Generalist stamp collectors usually prefer lightly cancelled stamps which have the postmark on a corner or small portion of the stamp without obscuring the stamp itself, which ordinarily are more valuable than heavily cancelled stamps. In order to get the postal clerk to cancel the stamps lightly, collectors may rubber-stamp or write "philatelic mail" on the envelope.

Cancellations may significantly affect the value of the stamps. Many stamps are rarer, and consequently much more expensive, in unused condition, such as the Penny Black, which in 1999, catalogued for $1,900 mint and $110 used. The reverse is true for some stamps, such as the hyperinflation stamps of Germany, which may be worth many times more if genuinely postally used. Where stamps are much more valuable in used condition than unused, it may be advisable to have such stamps expertised to confirm that the cancellation is genuine and contemporary.

Some stamp collectors are interested in the cancellations themselves, on or off cover, of a particular country or issue, or collect a specific type of cancellation, such as fancy cancels. Birth date cancels are also collected. There have been many published studies of the cancellations of many countries, some of which are listed below. Collectors who are interested in the cancellations themselves prefer bold, readable cancellations. Cancellations also are an integral part of the collection of postal history.

Historically, collectors disliked pen cancels and removed many of them, making the stamp appear unused or to add a fake cancellation. Today, early United States pen cancelled stamps still are worth considerably less than examples with hand stamped cancels.

Collectors generally view modern cancelled-to-order stamps or CTOs as philatelic junk, and they rarely have any significant value. Stamp catalogs commonly state whether their values for used stamps are for CTOs or for postally used examples. For example, the Scott Catalog used value listings for the German Democratic Republic are for CTOs from 1950 through mid-1990, over 2700 stamps.

== Forgeries ==
Forgers have not only manufactured stamps for the philatelic market but also added forged cancellations to those stamps. This was especially common in the late 19th century and the early 20th century, when huge numbers of inexpensive stamps were forged for the packet trade.

Forged cancellations have also been applied to genuine stamps if the stamps are worth much more postally used. In addition, if rare cancellations are desired by collectors, those cancellations have also been forged.

Cancellations may also be used to prove that certain philatelic items are genuine. For example, forgers have fabricated many supposedly-valuable postal covers by adding genuine stamps and forged postal markings to pre-stamp covers. A cover can be shown to be genuine if a genuine cancellation "ties" the stamp or stamps to the cover or, in other words, if a genuine cancellation runs continuously over the stamp and adjacent portion of the envelope. However, one still may need to rule out the possibility that the cancellation was added later. Similarly, stamps that were cut in parts and used for a portion of the full value as splits can be shown to have been so used only if a genuine cancel ties the stamp to the cover or piece of cover.

== Cancellation symbols ==
The Michel stamp catalog uses a set of symbols for different types of cancellations:

- postmark cancels (used in less precise catalogues for any cancellation)
- pen cancels
- fiscal cancels
- cancelled-to-order
- hole-punch cancels
- Ⓢ special-issue postmarks
- Ⓣ date postmarks

Philatelic dealers and auctioneers may use entirely different sets of symbols.

== See also ==
- Postage stamp reuse
- Postage meter
- Event cover

== Studies of cancellations ==
Great Britain, Ireland & Commonwealth

- R.C. Alcock & F.C. Holland, The Postmarks of Great Britain and Ireland, 1660–1940 (Alcock, Cheltenham 1940)(and supplements).
- George Brumell, British Post Office Numbers 1844–1906 (Alcock, Cheltenham 1971).
- Robert Danzig & David Goldsmith, The Cancellations of the 1841 Penny Red (Philatelic Imprint, London 1991).
- William Kane, Catalogue of the postal markings of Dublin, c. 1840–1922 (M.P.Giffney, Dublin 1981).
- John Parmenter, Michael Goodman, & John Saylor Jr., Barred Numeral Cancellations, Vols. I-IV (1985–1988).
- H.C. Westley, The Postal Cancellations of London, 1840–1890 (H.F. Johnson 1950).
- J.T. Whitney, Collect British Postmarks: Handbook to British Postal Markings and Their Values (British Postmark Society).
- H.M. Campbell, Queensland cancellations and other postal markings 1860–1913 (Royal Philatelic Society of Victoria, Melbourne 1977).
- J.R.W. Purves, Victoria: the "Barred Numeral" Cancellations, 1856–1912, and the post offices which used them (Royal Philatelic Society of Victoria, Melbourne 1963).
- R.J.G. Collins, The Cancellations of New Zealand: with notes on the early philatelic history (Kiwi Publishers Christchurch, N.Z. 1926 (1995)).
- Tom Lee & John Watts, New Zealand pictorial and special event date stamps, 1882–2002 (North Shore Philatelic Society, Auckland 2002).
- H.C. Dann, The cancellations of the Rhodesias and Nyasaland (Robson Lowe Ltd., London 1950).
- D.R. Martin, Numbers in Early Indian Cancellations, 1855–1884 (Robson Lowe, London 1970).
- Webb, F.W. The Philatelic and Postal History of Hong Kong and the Treaty Ports of China and Japan (1961, reprinted James Bendon, Ltd., Cyprus 1991)
- Schoenfeld, H. Cancellations of the Treaty Ports of Hong Kong, 1850–1930 (1998)
- Proud, E.B. The Postal History of the British Colonies: Hong Kong, Volume 1: 1841–1958 (1989)

United States

- James M Cole, Cancellations and Killers of the Banknote Era, 1870–1894 (U.S. Philatelic Classics Society Columbus, OH 1995).
- Kenneth L. Gilman, The New Herst-Sampson catalog : a Guide to 19th century United States Postmarks and Cancellations (D.G. Phillips Pub. Co. North Miami, FL 1989).
- R. F. Hanmer, A collector's guide to U.S. Machine Postmarks, 1871–1925: with examples of later types (D.G. Phillips Pub. Co. North Miami 3d rev. ed. 1989).
- Herman Herst Jr., Fancy Cancellations on Nineteenth Century United States Postage Stamps (Shrub Oak, New York 3rd rev. ed. 1963).
- Foster W. Loso, Twentieth Century United States Fancy Cancellations (Somerset Press, c. 1952).
- Moe Luff, United States Postal Slogan Cancel Catalog (Spring Valley, N.Y. rev. ed 1968).
- Sol Salkind, U.S. Cancels 1890–1900, with Special Emphasis on the Fancy Cancels found on the 2¢ Red Definitive Stamps of this period (David G. Phillips Co. c. 1985).
- Hubert C. Skinner & Amos Eno, United States Cancellations, 1845–1869:Unusual and Representative Markings (American Philatelic Society, State College, PA 1980).
- Scott R. Trepel, U.S. postmarks and cancellations (Philatelic Foundation, New York 1992).
- William R. Weiss Jr. & Foster W. Loso, The Complete Pricing Guide of United States 20th Century Fancy Cancellations (W.R. Weiss Jr. 1987).
- Michel Zareski & Herman Herst, Fancy Cancellations on 19th Century United States Postage Stamps (Shrub Oak, NY. 3d rev. ed. 1962).

Austria-Hungary

- Edwin Mueller, Handbook of Austria and Lombardy-Venetia Cancellations on the Postage Stamp Issues 1850–1864, Wien 1961, including a unique valuation system referred to as "Points Mueller".
- Edwin Mueller, Die Poststempel auf der Freimarken-Ausgabe 1867 von Österreich und Ungarn, 1930
- Wilhelm KLEIN, Die postalischen Abstempelungen auf den österreichischen Postwertzeichen-Ausgaben 1867, 1883 und 1890, 1967 (in German)

Belgium

- NIPA, Catalogue spécialisé des oblitérations belges 1849–1910, 1999 (nl-fr)

Canada

- K. M. Day, Canadian Fancy Cancellations of the Nineteenth Century (British North America Philatelic Society, Toronto 1963).
- D.M. Lacelle, Fancy cancels on Canadian stamps 1855 to 1950 (British North America Philatelic Society Ltd., Ottawa 2007).
- Lewis M. Ludlow, Catalogue of Canadian railway cancellations and related transportation postmarks (L.M. Ludlow, Tokyo 1982).
- G.Douglas Murray, 2000 postmarks of Prince Edward Island, 1814 to 1995 (Retrospect Pub., Charlottetown, PEI 1996).
- Cecil C. Coutts, Slogan Postmarks Of Canada (Agassiz-Harrison Printers & Stationers Ltd., Agassiz British Columbia 2007)

France

- Jean Pothion, France Obliterations 1849–1876 (La Poste aux Letters, Paris 1975).

German States

- Hans GROBE,Altdeutschland Spezial-Katalog und Handbuch, 1975 (in German)
- Peter SEM, BAYERN Spezialkatalog, Handbuch Kreuzerausgaben, 1985 Bamberg
- A. von Lenthe, Hannover Postanstalten und Poststempel, 1971 (in German)
- Friedrich SPALINK, Die Deutschen Hufeisen Stempel, 1974 Selbstverlag (the famous German horseshoes)
- Peter FEUSER, Nachverwendete Altdeutschland-Stempel, 1983 (for cancellations still in use after unification of Germany)

Netherlands

- H. Koopman, Catalogus der Puntstempels van Nederland, Uitgave van Van Dieten Boeken, 1972 (with prices for 259 numbers)
- H. Koopman, Catalogus der Kleinrond stempels van Nederland, 1972 (with prices)
- Dr. Fred. L. Reed, De Halfrondstempels op de Emissie 1852 Nederland (en: The Halfround Postmarks on the First Issue of the Netherlands, with values expressed in Points), published by J.L. Van Dieten (Den Haag)
- D.C. Hoogerdijk, De Naam - of Langstempel van Nederland, met prijsnoteringen, 1972, with values expressed in Gulden (1 to 2500), published by W.H. De Munnik, 's-Gravenhage.

Latin America

- Joseph Schatzkes (rev. Karl H. Shimmer), The Cancellations of Mexico, 1856–1874 (W.E. Shelton n.p. 1983).
- Lamy et Rinck, PEROU Oblitérations postales de 1857 à 1873, Classification et cotation, 1964 (in French)

Elsewhere

- Archibald G.M. Batten, The Postmarks of the Orange Free State and the Orange River Colony, 1868–1910 (1972).
- Roger Hosking, Paquebot Cancellations of the World (Oxted 1977).
- Derek Willan (editor), Greek Rural Postmen and Their Cancellation Numbers (Hellenic Philatelic Society of Great Britain, 1994)
- John H. Coles & Howard E. Walker, Postal Cancellations of the Ottoman Empire (Christie's-Robson Lowe, London [1984]–1995).
- Resımlı Osmanli Illustrated Ottoman Turkish Postmarks 1840–1929 (Tűrk Posta Damgalari) (10 vols in process).
