= Valuation of cancellations of the Austrian Empire =

The study of postmarks is a specialized branch of philately called marcophily. It brings added value to the stamps by their historical significance. Other parameters are the rarity and the attractiveness. In particular, the stamps issued by the Habsburg monarchy during the 1850-1867 period (the 5 issues before the Austro-Hungarian compromise of 1867), are collected for their variety and beauty. A first publication on this topic was made by Hans Kropf in 1899. Edwin Mueller in his Handbook of Austria and Lombardy-Venetia Cancellations on the Postage Stamp Issues 1850-1864, published in 1961, described all postmarks used in the Austrian empire, Lombardy, Venetia and in the Austria post-offices in the Ottoman Empire. The relative valuation of those postmarks contains a popularity index, which is a multiplicative factor on top of the rarity. Closely related article is Postage stamps and postal history of Austria for a better understanding of the historical context.

== The historical context ==
The Austrian Empire stamps were first issued on June 1, 1850: a coat of arms under the text KK Post-Stempel. The word Austria does not appear, which is logical, as the issue served in whole central Europe, more precisely in all or in part of the current following countries:

- in the north the Czech Republic, Slovakia, Poland;
- in the East Ukraine, Romania;
- in the South Serbia, Slovenia, Croatia, Montenegro, Italy;
- Austria and Hungary.

The languages used are German, Italian, Hungarian, Czech, Serbo-Croat, Polish and French Chargé.

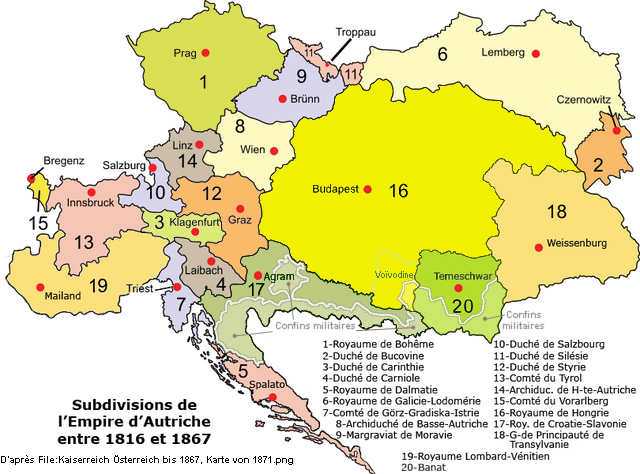
The Austrian Empire is present in all central Europe

This article is linked to the article Postage stamps and postal history of Austria. For a better understanding of the historical context, see the article Austria-Hungary.

== The collection of cancellations of Austria ==
Collecting of cancellations, in particular the 1850 issues of Austria and Lombardy-Venetia, has a long tradition. The first important collection of the kind was assembled by Hans Kropf. He published The Cancellations of the stamps of Austria-Hungary and Lombardy-Venetia, a handbook with 959 different cancellation types, in 1899. His collection was purchased by King Fuad I of Egypt, and by Marc Fitch in 1954. The Jerger collection (see below) has made complements to this collection, with items from Baron Ferrari, Felix Brunner, Maurice Burrus, Arthur Caspary, Dale-Lichtenstein, the King Carol I of Romania, and others.

== The system used by Edwin Mueller ==
The cancellations (or postmarks in more general terms) can be studied, classified and valuated based on the handbook, compiled by Edwin Mueller.

Edwin Mueller describes each of the postmark type by a series of codes (13 basic forms, 5 types of lettering, with or without a year etc.), and idealized pictures.

The 505 types that have been used for each of the 3381 post-offices are documented from the first (I) to the fifth (V) issue, with their opening date: when relevant, the letter P means that the postmark was already in use in 1850 (precursor of the pre-stamp period).

The handbook relies on an original system of relative valuation. It is a valuation expressed in points, result of a double multiplicative content:

- a point system which indicates the relative rarity, between 1 and 250
- a popularity index, between 2 and 30.

The valuation points can thus vary (in principle) between 1 and 30 x 250 = 7500.

The market value of an ordinary type cancellation depends primarily only on its rarity index (1 by default), while if it displays attractive characters (color other than black, originality, beauty..), it is the multiplicative result of both indexes which determines the global Mueller valuation points.

The article further illustrates by a few examples this popularity index.

== The popularity index ==
=== Index 1 : the basic types ===
The value of those cancellations depend only on their relative rarity (and on usual characteristics like their degree of completeness, cleanliness, centering (SON)...). This value is added to the stamp value, of course.

Some examples :

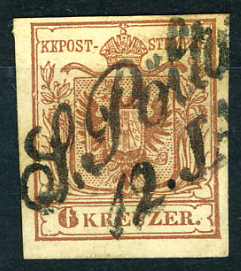
Type sL-I of St. Pölten, 5p ('s' means cursive lettering, 'I' means Italic lettering)

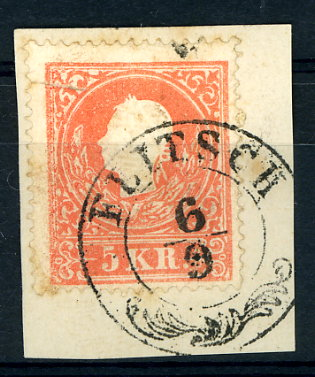
Type RDb-f, of Flitsch, now Bovec, 12p ('Db' means double circle and usual ornament; 'f' means date without year)

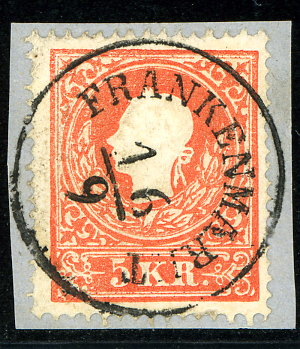
Type RS-f (the single circle is the most common postmark type, used by 2,311 post offices: 'S' for single circle. The rarity for the Frankenmarkt single circle on this issue is 35p)

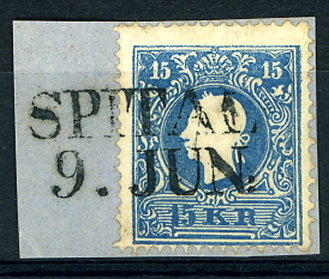
Type RL-R of Spittal an der Drau, 6p - 'RL-R' means 2 linear lines of Roman type (Antiqua) lettering

=== Index 2 ===
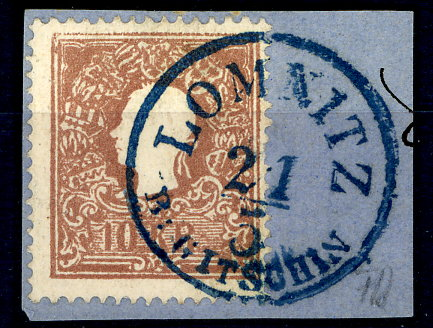
Single circle of Lomnitz, now Lomnice nad Popelkou. Type RS-f, with 30p rarity and a x2 modifier because of the blue ink

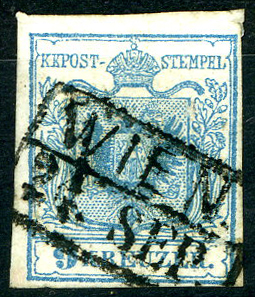
Boxed postmark out Vienna. Type GkB-R with the lettering 'G' for Grotesk - Sans-Serif and 'R' Antiqua - Roman; 'k' for Divided Box - 2p with a x2 modifier for the design

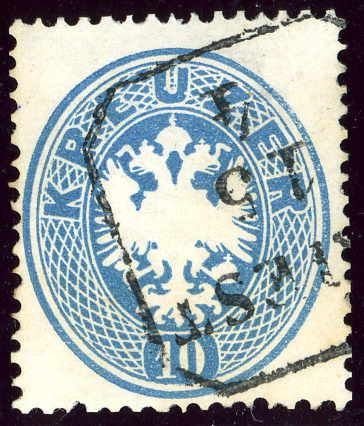
Curved rectangular postmark of Trieste. Type RhK-f with 'K' for rounded rectangular postmark, 1p with a x2 modifier for design

=== Index 3 ===
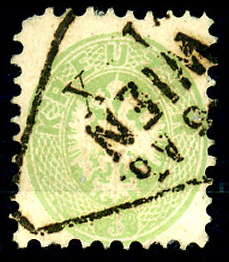
Type GF-fh A fancy rare form (losange for example WIEN (Vienna) (3x3 Points)

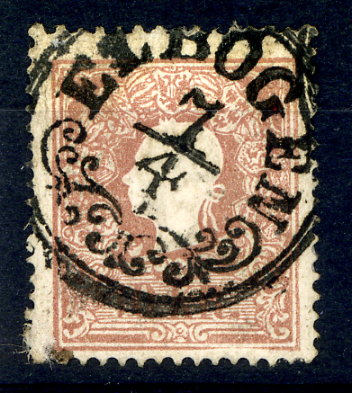
Type R2So-f (the small o means ornamented frame for ELBOGEN (Loket) (15x3 Points)

=== Index 4 ===
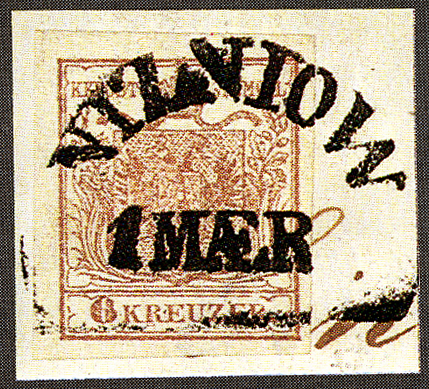
Type RC-R (200x4 points) of NIZNIOW, now Ukraine (Nyzhniv).

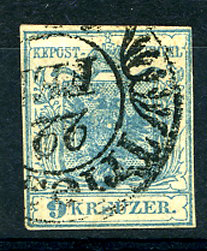
Type RDo-Iy TRIEST (Trieste) (the year 1850 or 1851 is outside the stamp)

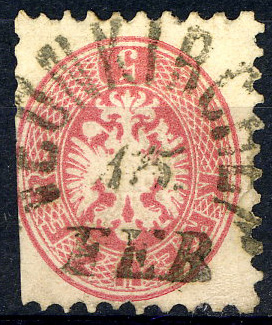
Type GC-I (4x4 Points) of NEUNKIRCHEN (Neunkirchen, Austria)

=== Index 6 ===
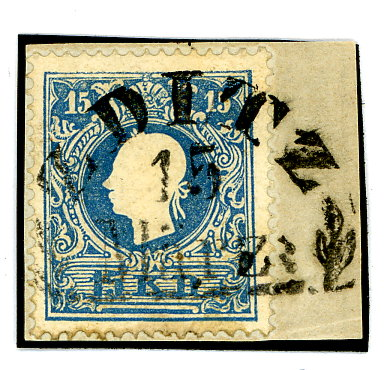
ZDITZ Zdice Type RCo-R (15x6 P)

Letter C indicates a curved format in semi-circle. It is a relatively rare cancellation (15) and beautiful (index 6) hence 90 points Mueller.

=== Index 8 ===
Letter O indicates an Oval postmark:

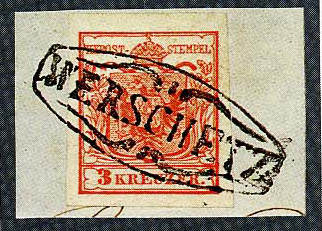
Type RfOd (70x8=560 P) of Werschetz (Vršac) - Sold 1100 SF in 1981

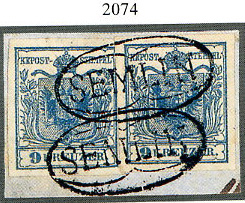
Type ROo of SEMLIN (Zemun) (12x8 P)- Sold 220 SF in 2003

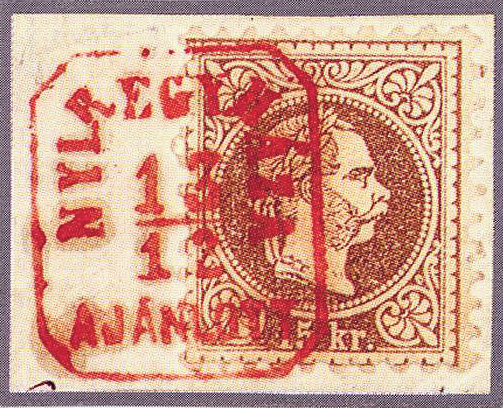
Type agK red of Nyíregyháza, Ajanlott (registered) (60x8 P) - sold 1,100 SF in 1999

=== Index 10 ===
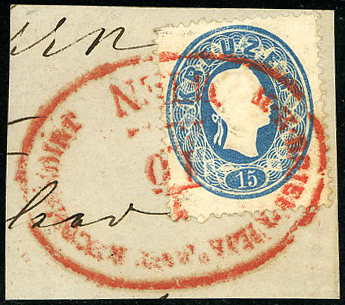
Type RzO-fy rouge (5x10 P)

Red ink for recommended letters from Vienna K.K. BRIEF-FILIALAMT RECOMANDIRT

=== Index 15 ===
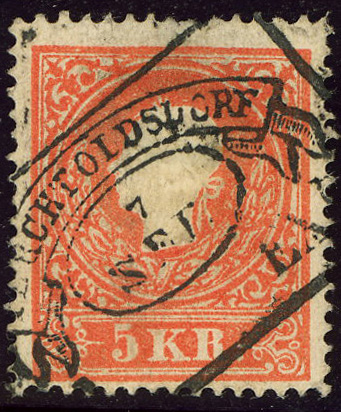
Type RyB-ROeh of PERCHTOLDSDORF (30x15 P): These fancy ornaments of wine growing villages near Vienna are in popular demand.

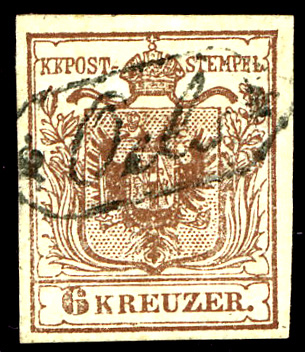
Type sqBo of OELS in Bohemia rarity 40 thus 600 P Mueller.

=== Index 20 ===
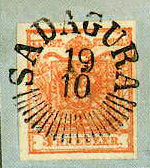
Type RCj-f of SADAGURA (Bucovine, Sadhora) (40x20 P)- Sold 1000 SF in 2003

=== Index 25 ===
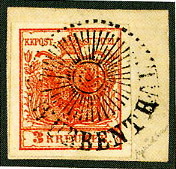
Type RCj of WÜRBENTHAL (Vrbno pod Pradedem) (175x25 P) - Sold 3400 SF in 2003

=== Index 30 ===
A rare series of mute cancellations exists, each given a x30 multiplier due to their beauty.

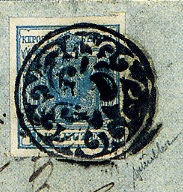
A mute cancel of Krakau on a letter sold for SF9500 in 2003. A rarity of 70p with a x30 multiplier, totalling at 2,100 points

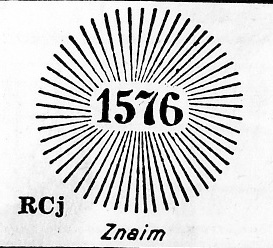
Type RCj of Znaim, now Znojmo. A rarity of 30p with a x30 multiplier, totalling at 900 points

== Prices reached during auctions ==
The net prices mentioned in Swiss Francs are those obtained (charges not included) in 2003 during the sale of a remarkable collection Sammlung Dr.Anton Jerger (1919-1987) & Elisabeth Jerger-Kramer (1921-2002) (mainly).

The most beautiful cancellations (complete on fragments) were close to 1 Euro per point Mueller.

== Auctions using the Mueller points ==
To be expanded

Besides the illustrated auction in 2003, other important stamps vendors have based their proposed values on the Mueller points:

- Stanley Gibbons Merkur GmbH, Frankfurt, 1976
- P. Rapp, Zürich, 1977
- Corinphila, Zürich, many.

== Valuation of later postmarks ==
After the death of Edwin Mueller in 1962, collectors felt the need to continue his work for later issues. Wilhelm Klein noticed a good continuity in many postmarks on the last issues in kreuzer. He thus decided to publish in 1967 a first part of the work, covering the issues 1867, 1883 and 1890. However, he dropped the Mueller system, presenting the rarity (Häufigkeit) and the popularity (Beliebtheit) in a single final point value. There are more than 700 images of postmarks, used by the 6186 fixed post offices (in the Austrian half of the monarchy) as of 30 September 1900.
