= Smith Collection =

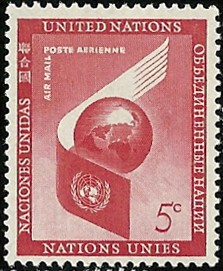
An airmail stamp of the United Nations.

The Smith Collection is a collection of philatelic material relating to the United Nations and the League of Nations that forms part of the British Library Philatelic Collections. The collection was formed by M. Martin Smith and bequeathed to the library in 2002.

== See also ==
- United Nations Postal Administration
