= Cancelled-to-order =

Postage stamp cancelled by the postal administration before sale to a stamp collector

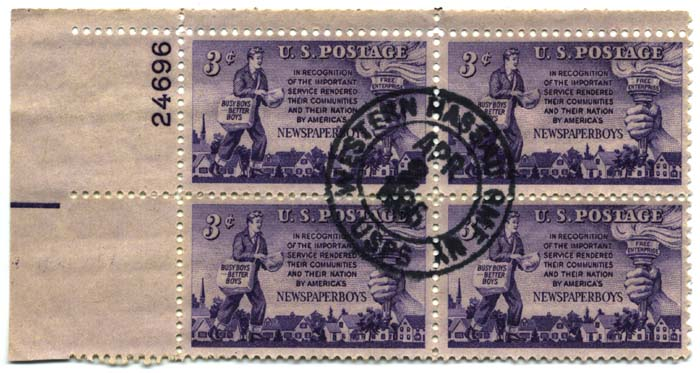
A Cancelled-to-order plate block of the US newspaper boy stamp of 1952.

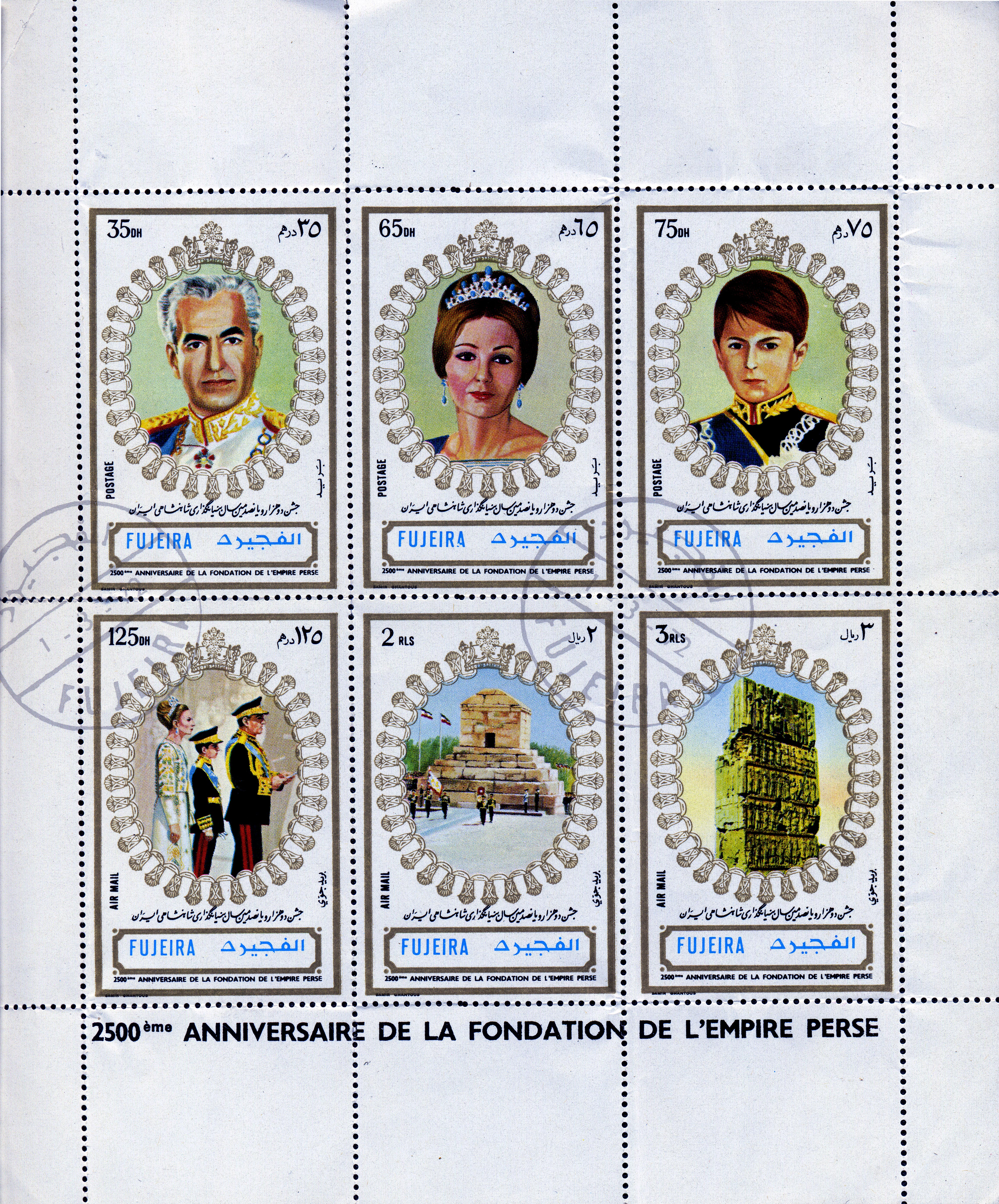
Cancelled-to-order "stamps" of Fujairah, one of the United Arab Emirates, showing unobtrusive placement of cancellations in stamp corners

A cancelled to order (also called and abbreviated CTO) postage stamp, philatelic symbol, is a stamp the issuing postal service has cancelled (marked as used), but has not traveled through the post, but instead gets handed back to a stamp collector or dealer. They can come from withdrawn stocks of stamps cancelled in sheets and sold as remainders or from new sheets for sale at reduced rates to the stamp trade. Postal services of various countries do this in response to collector demand, or to preclude stamps issued for the collector market being used on mail. Some of the history of CTOs is from stamps being given to collectors on an approval basis, in person or through mailings; the first CTOs began in the late 19th century.

== Background ==
While some collectors value mint postage stamps, others prefer to collect stamps that have been used. In practice, it is slow and difficult to build a comprehensive collection by removing stamps from mailed envelopes, so modern postal administrations accommodate collectors by offering new stamps already cancelled. The advantage for collectors is that the stamps count as officially used without being subjected to the stress of actually going through the mail. Also, the postal service can arrange a relatively light and unobtrusive cancellation mark.

== Postmarked to order ==
Similar to cancel to order is postmarked to order which occurs when the stamps are purchased at full value, placed on a piece of mail, and then cancelled by the clerk on request. The mail then is handed back to the customer instead of travelling through the post. This is sometimes called favour cancellation, or hand-back. Some countries' postal regulations permit this and others forbid it. It is misleading because the cancelled envelope appears to have gone through the mails though it has not. For instance, it is missing additional postal markings typically applied to real mail.

== Misuse of cancellations ==
An illegitimate practice related to CTOs involves deliberate misuse of cancellation devices to make a stamp appear used. This typically happens for stamps from remote places, or that were in use for only short periods. Used stamps can be more valuable than unused, sometimes by an order of magnitude. This form of philatelic forgery may involve use of rare types of canceling devices, unusual dates in postmarks, and so forth.

== Topical issues ==
Another form of CTO is especially common in countries that try to make money from collectors by issuing large numbers of topical stamps. To make more sales, the stamps must be inexpensive, but if the issuing postal service prices them below face value, commercial mailers could use them to save money by routing their mail through the issuing country, financially hurting the issuer. So these countries issue most of their collector stamps as CTOs. It is easy to recognize such stamps. The cancellation is neat, usually in one corner without a town name, and the gum is still present.

Some countries, such as the emirates that later joined the United Arab Emirates, went further and printed the cancellation directly onto the stamp with the rest of the design. Many collectors do not consider these authentic stamps, and some catalogs categorize them separately.

== Modern issues ==
Many modern stamp issues are hard to find genuinely postally used. Due to this, catalogs such as Stanley Gibbons only list modern issues of some countries as cancelled-to-order.
