= Precancel =

Postage stamp which has been cancelled before use

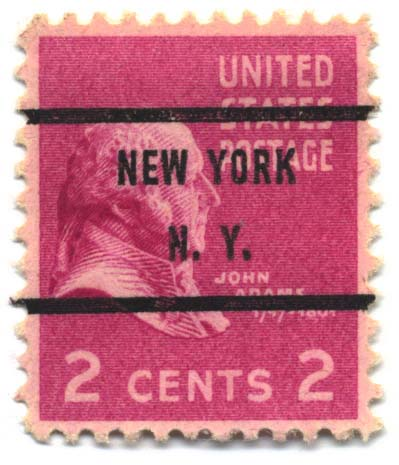
U.S. 2¢ stamp of 1938 with New York precancel, Scott No. 806, PSS type 71

A precanceled stamp, or precancel for short, is a postage stamp that has been legitimately cancelled before being affixed to mail. A number of nations of the world use precancels, typically in the form of an overprint on definitive series stamps.

== Use ==
Precanceled stamps are typically used by mass mailers, who can save the postal system time and effort by prearranging to use the precancels, and delivering the stamped mail ready for sorting. The postal administration will typically offer an incentive in the form of a reduced price for precanceled stamps in volume. Precancels cannot normally be purchased by the general public, although they are often seen in one's daily mail.

== History ==
=== Canada ===
Canada used precancels from 1889 to 1982. Initially, they consisted only of waves and bars applied with ink roller, but the town and province was added in 1903, similar to in the United States. In 1922, the precancel was changed to three pairs of horizontal bars. In the 1930s, town names were replaced with a corresponding numeral of either four numbers or three numbers preceded by an 'X'.

=== France ===
Widespread French use of precancels began in 1920 with cancels including the year and city. This was scrapped in 1922 in favour of a standard overprint in a semicircle reading AFFRANCHts. POSTES (Affranchissements Postes).

During their time as French colonies, Algeria and Tunisia also issued precancels.

=== Monaco ===
Monaco has issued precancels since 1943, with an identical overprint to that of France.

=== United Nations ===
The United Nations Postal Administration has only issued one precancel, a 1½ cent stamp used from 1952 to 1959.

=== United States ===
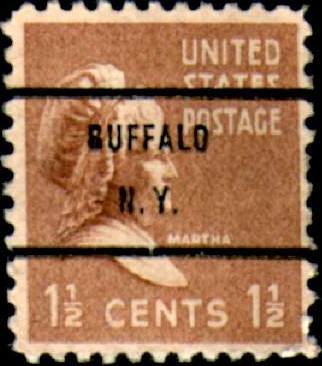
The 1903 standardised design with the city and state between two horizontal lines.

The first use of precancels (both in the US and globally) was by Hale & Co., an independent mail company in the United States in the 1840s which undercut the expensive United States Post Office Department (POD). The first precancels were created in 1843 or early 1844 and their complexity varies; most were "crude straight lines" across the stamps, but examples from Portsmouth, New Hampshire were precanceled with "P / N.H." in block letters. Hale & Co., along with all other independent mail carriers, was shut down by an 1845 act of Congress.

The POD authorised precanceling of stamps in 1887, and produced standardised guidelines on their design in May 1903. US precancels are generally divided into two groups: Bureaus and Locals. Locals, used unofficially since the 1840s, were prepared by postmasters using stamps and equipment they had on hand. Bureaus are those manufactured by the Bureau of Engraving and Printing, which came into use in the 1910s. (Note: The exact date of the introduction of Bureaus is unclear; Forster gives 1916 while the Precancel Stamp Society gives 1913. This confusion may be due to the fact that in 1913, the POD began distributing precanceling devices so making most precancels consistent, and that in 1916, the Bureau printed precancels for Augusta, Maine, New Orleans, Louisiana, and Springfield, Massachusetts as an experimental venture. The experiment was judged a failure and was discontinued. The Bureau began regularly printing precancels again in 1923.)

Precancels are known from over 20,000 towns across all 50 states, Guam, Puerto Rico and American Samoa.

=== Postal training ===
Around the early twentieth century, some U.S. business colleges used specially pre-cancelled stamps or stamp-like labels to train students in the handling of stamps. Precancels were also used to train Post Office employees in the United Kingdom.

== Study ==
The Precancel Gazette, a magazine for precancel collectors, was first published in 1919 and the Black Book, a catalog of US precancel stamps, was first published in 1940. The Precancel Stamp Society, formed in 1922 from two previously-existing clubs, specializes in the study of precancels. A number of catalogs list all the types of precancels issued in the countries that use them.

== Gallery ==
Examples of precancel stamps
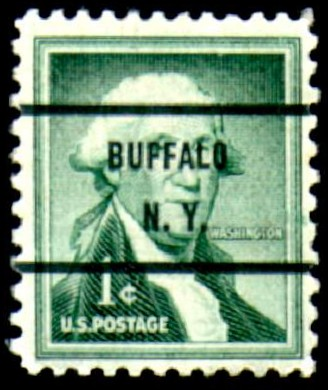
Precancel stamp of the United States from Buffalo, New York

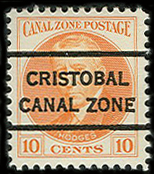
Precancel stamp from the Panama Canal Zone

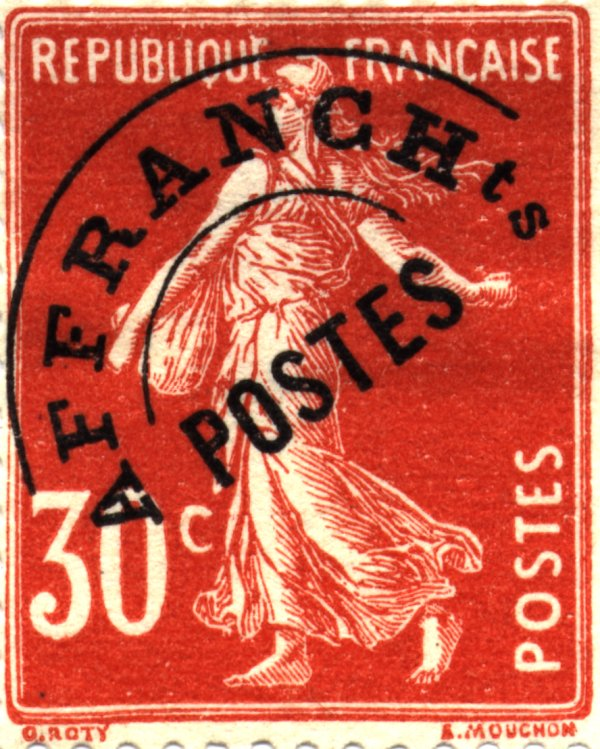
Precancel stamp of France

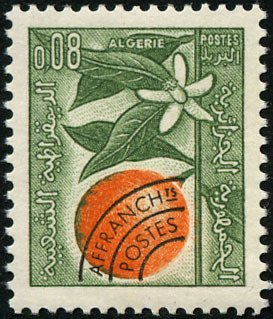
Precancel stamp of Algeria

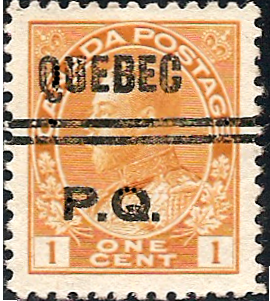
Canadian precancel stamp from Quebec City

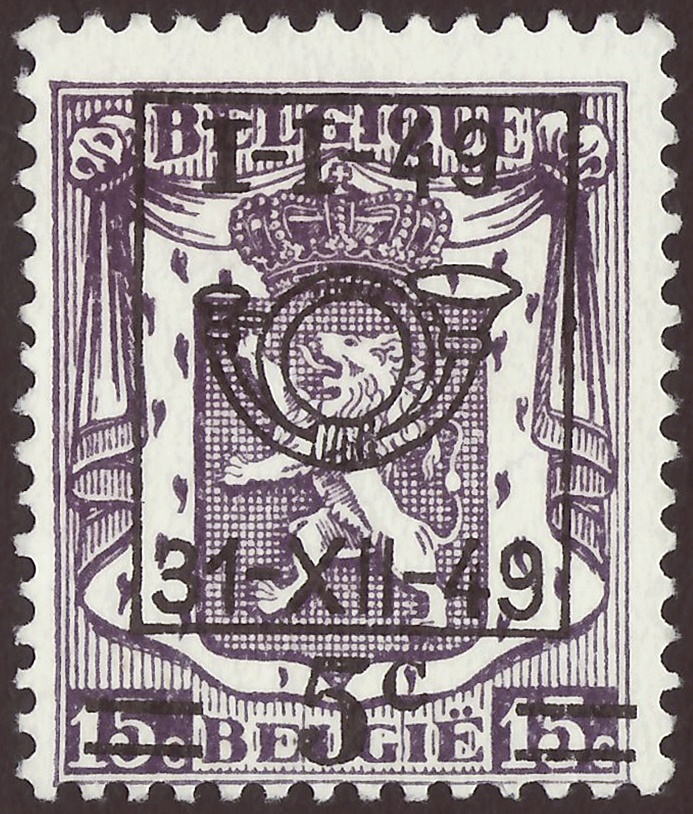
Precancel stamp of Belgium

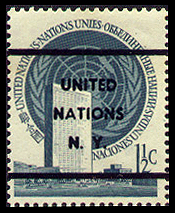
Precancel stamp of the United Nations Postal Administration
