= Lamy (and Rinck) =

Perou: étude des obliterations postales sur les émissions de 1857 a 1873
- Author: Georges Lamy; Jacques-André Rinck
- Language: Trilingual
- Subject: Peruvian postal cancellations
- Genre: Philately
- Publication date: 1960

In Peruvian philately, Lamy (infrequently Lamy and Rinck) refers to a catalogue of cancellations found on classic Peruvian stamps, from the first issue in 1857 to the end of the use of imperforate stamps in 1873.

Georges Lamy published his initial study in 1955 and was joined by co-author Jacques-André Rinck in the 1960 trilingual edition entitled, Perou: étude des obliterations postales sur les émissions de 1857 a 1873. Only 330 copies of the book were printed, and there is at least one pirated edition. For collectors, the utility of the catalogue is in its illustration of 147 cancellation types, the cities and towns where they were struck, together with an estimate of how rare is each particular cancellation on a scale from 0 (very common) to 100 (exceedingly rare). Thus, a seller or collector describing a Peruvian stamp as Lamy 24 coef. 20 means that the type of cancellation is the catalogue's number 24 and the rarity coefficient of such a mark from a particular town is 20.
