= Bullseye (philately) =

Type of stamp cancellation

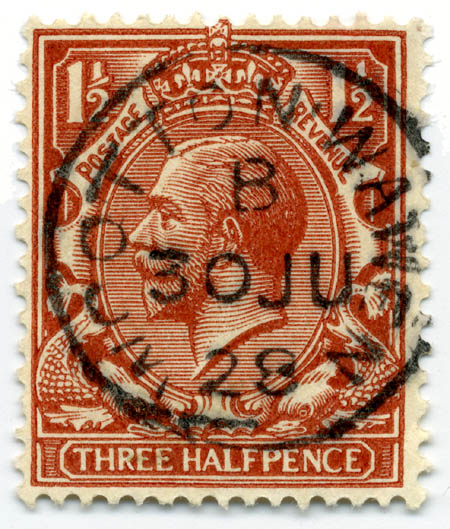
1928 King George V socked on the nose

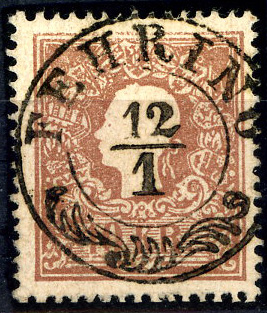
Ideally centered Austrian cancellation ca 1858

Bullseye, in philately, also called Socked on the nose (SON), refers to a cancellation of a postage stamp in which the postmark, typically a circle with the date and town name where mailed, has been applied centered on the stamp. The ideal bullseye has the entire postmark inside the margins, although this is not always possible, because the stamp may be too small or the postmark too large. The colloquial expression "Socked on the nose" does not seem to be used in Europe: the terms Oblitération centrale in French or luxus in German are in common usage.

Austria introduced ca 1868 a set of cancellations of small diameter (< 20 mm), so that they could be seen entirely on all stamps.

Some philatelists and collectors of cancellations have a special interest in bullseyes primarily because the date, time, and place the stamp was used, or postmarked, can be identified by the cancellation. This allows specialised collectors to collect, for example, all of the postmarks of a particular country, state, city, county, date range, etc., without collecting entire covers.

There can be some confusion with the term "Bullseye" as it can mean both the type of cancel, such as the early American concentric ring cancel (as well as other countries that used them) and to have a cancel positioned right in the center of a stamp. So while an SON cancel is always near the centre of a stamp and can be an example of a Circular Date Stamp (CDS) or a "Bullseye" cancel or other shapes that were used as cancelling devices, (Square, Oval etc.) strictly speaking a "Bullseye Cancel" literally is a cancel that looks like a "bullseye".

Because modern machine cancellations are normally arranged so that the wavy lines, slogans, or other killers are applied to the stamp, leaving the postmark clear, dealers and collectors desiring SONs will position the stamp on the cover so as to fall under the postmark.
