= Edwin Müller =

Austrian philatelist

- Born: December 2, 1898; Vienna, Austria-Hungary
- Died: October 4, 1962 (aged 63); New York City, United States
- Engineering career
- Institutions: Fédération Internationale de la Presse Philatélique
- Projects: Expert, writer and editor of philately; emigrated to the United States from Austria in 1938
- Awards: Austrian Cross of Honor; APS Hall of Fame

Edwin Müller, anglicised as Edwin Mueller (December 2, 1898 – October 4, 1962), was an Austrian philatelist. His work on the classic Austrian stamps is an important document of Austrian philately. His catalogues of postmarks are renowned for their accuracy.

== Life ==
Edwin Müller was born on December 2, 1898 in Vienna. He became interested in stamps as a child. After World War I at the beginning of the 1920s, he started to publish his own stamp journal, "Die Postmarke", which soon became one of the most important philatelic journals in the world. At that time, Müller devoted himself mainly to the stamps of Austria-Hungary. Widely noticed publications emerged during this period. Müller advanced to become one of the world's most distinguished philatelists.

The Austrian government gave him the task of organising the International Philatelic Exhibition in Vienna (WIPA 1933), one of the largest philatelic exhibitions in the world before World War II. Because of the great success of the WIPA, he was even awarded honours by the state. In the same year, Müller became the president of the Fédération Internationale de la Presse Philatélique.

After the Anschluß of Austria with the German Reich in 1938, Müller took refuge in the United States. He changed his name to Edwin Mueller and in the following years, he continued his philatelic studies and acted as an auctioneer for the first time. Amongst other pursuits, he was a stamp dealer, forming the Mercury Stamp Company in 1954, and was the author of philatelic journals until his death in New York.

== Selected publications ==
- Großes Handbuch der Abstempelungen von Altösterreich und Lombardei-Venetien, Vienna 1925
- Die Postmarken von Österreich, Vienna 1927
- Die Poststempel auf der Freimarkenausgabe 1867 von Österreich und Ungarn, Vienna 1930
- Österreich Spezial-Katalog 1850–1918, New York 1952, bilingual
- Handbuch der vorphilatelistischen Poststempel Österreichs/Handbook of the Pre-Stamps Postmarks of Austria, New York 1960
- Handbuch der Entwertungen von Österreich und Lombardei-Venetien, New York 1961, bilingual

== See also ==
- Postage stamps and postal history of Austria
- Valuation of cancellations of the Austrian Empire
