= United Nations Postal Administration =

Postal service agency of the United Nations

- Abbreviation: UNPA
- Formation: 16 November 1950; 75 years ago
- Type: Postal agency
- Legal status: Active
- Head: Chief; Thanawat Amnajanan
- Parent organization: United Nations
- Website: www.unstamps.org

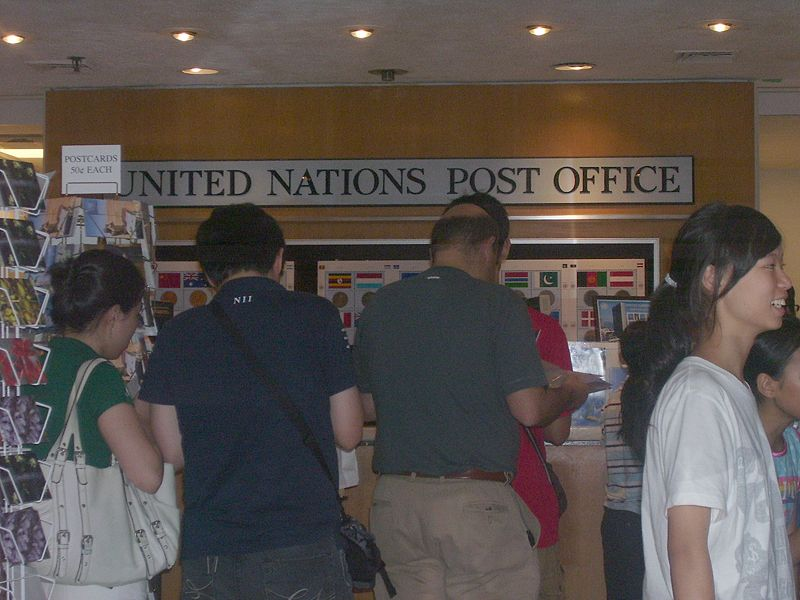
A busy United Nations Post Office at the United Nations Headquarters, New York City

The United Nations Postal Administration (UNPA) is the postal agency of the United Nations. It issues postage stamps and postal stationery, denominated in United States dollars for the office in New York, in Swiss francs for the office in Geneva and in euros (formerly schillings) for the office in Vienna. As such, UNPA is the only postal authority that issues stamps in three different currencies.

The Administration has a dual mandate: first, to disseminate information on the activities and achievements of the United Nations system through the medium of postage stamps, and second, to generate revenue for the organization.

== Usage and limitation ==
United Nations stamps, in the appropriate currency, are only valid for postage when used on mail at certain United Nations offices. The three facilities that accept these stamps are the UNPA offices at United Nations Headquarters, the Palais des Nations and Vienna International Centre.

On 4 September 2007, the UNPA posted on its Web page new rules limiting the mailings it will accept. Express mail and Priority Mail are no longer available to the public, and mailings from the public are limited to 100 pieces. The UNPA stated that the reason for this is that it was not established to provide all postal services, and that its primary function was to issue stamps for philatelic purposes.

== History ==
=== Beginnings ===
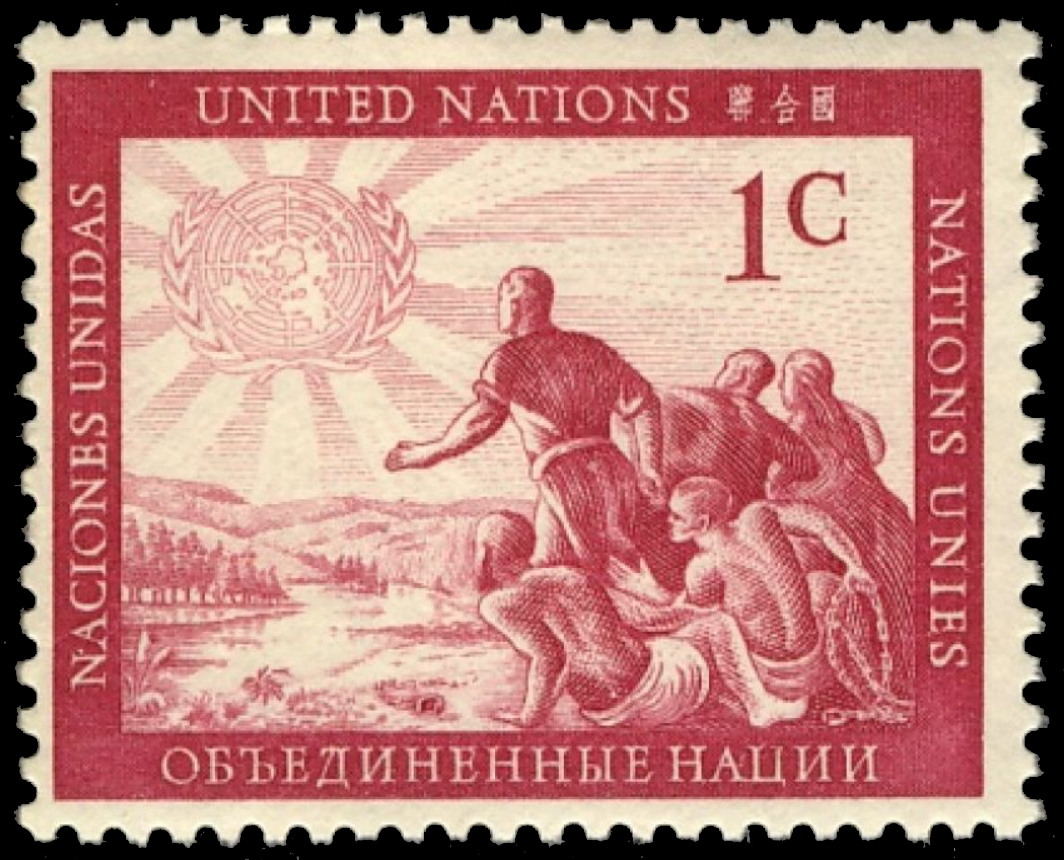
The first United Nations stamp issued in 1951.

The idea for the United Nations to issue stamps was first proposed in 1947 by the delegation of Argentina. The head of the delegation, José Arce, who was also President of the United Nations General Assembly, was himself a philatelist and wanted the United Nations to start issuing stamps. Arce thought that the stamps would serve three primary purposes for United Nations:

1. The ability to issue postage stamps, a privilege formerly reserved solely for sovereign states, would lend the United Nations authority.
2. The sale of these stamps would serve as an excellent source of revenue for the United Nations.
3. The stamps would serve as global ambassadors for the United Nations, spreading its messages, philosophies, and missions across the world.

On 20 November 1947, the General Assembly passed a resolution asking the Secretary-General to make inquiries into the possible creation of a United Nations postal service. This was followed by additional resolutions in 1948 and 1949 asking the Secretary-General to continue arrangements for the establishment of a postal service.

Finally, on 16 November 1950, the General Assembly formally created the Postal Administration and asked the Secretary-General to appoint a committee to design the first United Nations stamps.

An agreement was signed on 28 March 1951 between the United Nations and the United States Post Office Department which stipulated that the United Nations could start issuing postage stamps with two main provisions. First, that any stamps produced had to be denominated in United States dollars. Second, that these stamps could only be used at United Nations Headquarters.

The Postal Service was formally inaugurated on United Nations Day in 1951, with its first set of stamps also going on sale that day.

=== Early stamps and their popularity ===
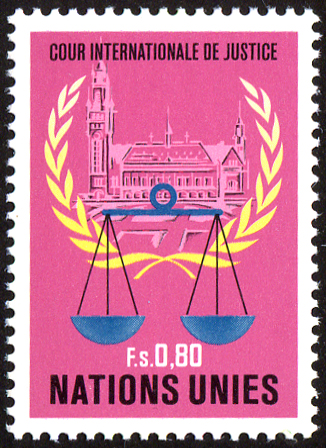
A 1979 stamp issued for the United Nations Geneva office, denominated in Swiss francs

The UNPA issued its first stamps for the New York offices in 1951. Collectors showed intense interest in the early issues, and a million stamps or more were sold of many of the early commemoratives. The scarcest item from this period, although still quite affordable, is the UN 10th-anniversary souvenir sheet, Scott #38, of which 250,000 were printed. A precancel of the first 1½-cent stamp that was used on a number of mass mailings has been extensively forged.

By 1957, the UNPA's commemoratives regularly sold out, though they might take several months to do so. Faced with this success, officials increased print-runs from the usual million stamps to as many as five million. Surprisingly, sales increased tremendously, and sales of each commemorative stamp remained in the 1.5 to 3 million range through the 1970s.

In 1967, the UNPA issued five stamps in Canadian-dollar denominations for use at the United Nations pavilion at Expo 1967 in Montreal, Quebec. They became invalid when Expo 1967 closed.

In 1968, the UNPA made an agreement with Swiss postal authorities, and on 4 October 1969 began to issue stamps in franc denominations for use at the Geneva offices. A 1979 agreement with Austria led to similar stamps for Vienna.

There was a resurgence of interest in UN stamps in the 1970s, which reached a peak with the almost immediate sellout of the panes of 20 issued for the UNPA's 25th anniversary—three of the four denominations sold out on the date of issue (8 October 1976); the fourth sold out within two-and-a-half months. A similar issue, in 1979, for the International Year of the Child sold out on the day of issue. The story made the front page of The New York Times. In 1980, the first of an annual series depicting members' national flags sold nearly 3.5 million of each individual stamp.

=== Controversy ===
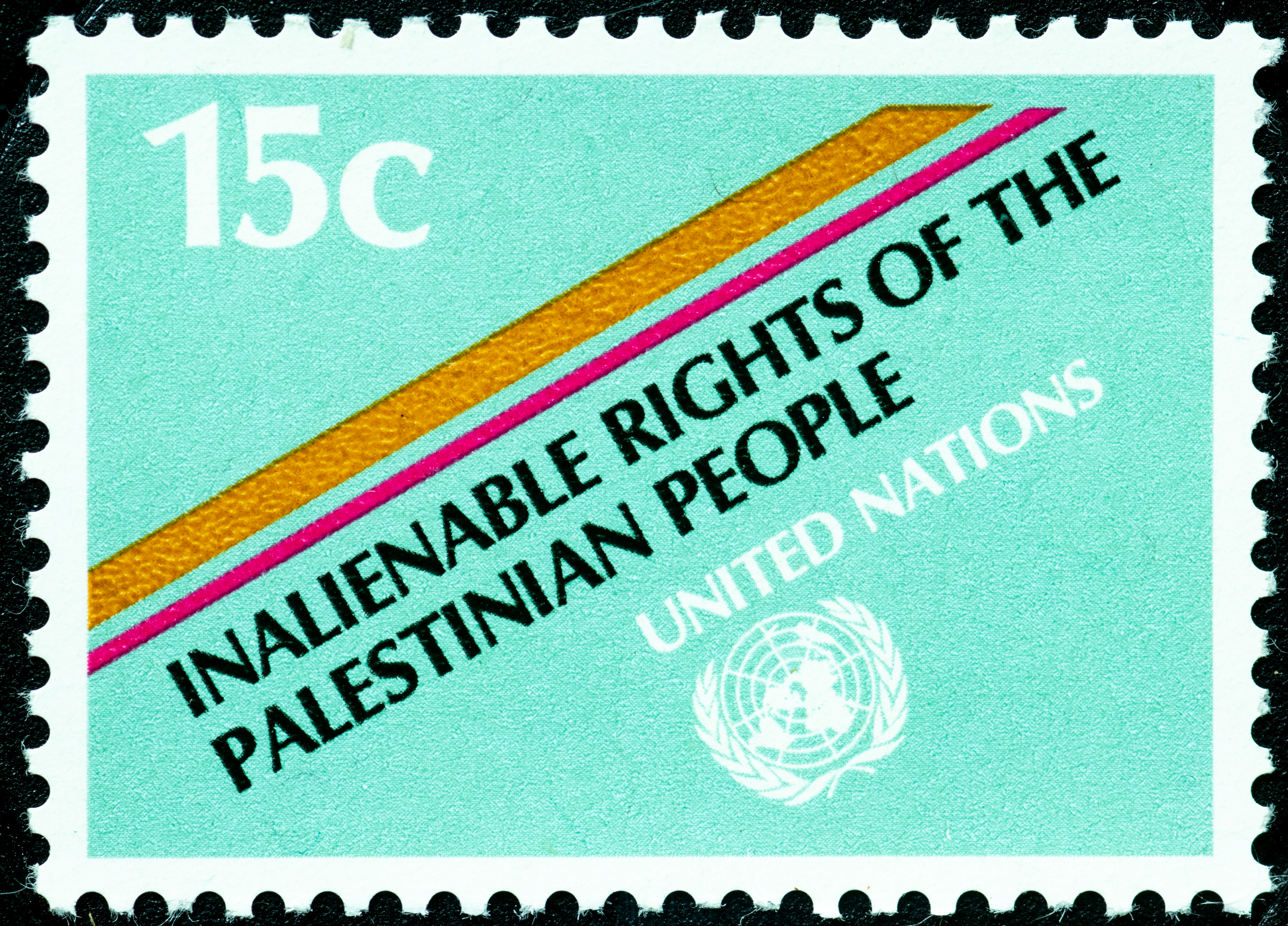
The 1981 United Nations stamp on the "Inalienable Rights of the Palestinian People".

Objections to UNPA's 1981 stamps on the "Inalienable Rights of the Palestinian People" came from Israeli and Jewish media which said the United Nations was promoting the Palestine Liberation Organization, which is considered a terrorist group by Israel. The stamp was met with further concern over the revenue it generated with some claiming the revenue would go to Yasser Arafat. Revenue from United Nations stamps are allocated to the general budget, not the cause they depict.

=== Decline in interest ===
Sales of United Nations stamps declined by two-thirds throughout the 1980s. An audit showed the UNPA's income declined from $13.5 million in 1980 to $4.5 million in 1987. Reasons for the decline were attributed to the political and social themes of the stamps, an aging population of collectors, and the general decline in stamp collecting worldwide.

=== Reviving collector interest ===
In an effort to increase sales, the UNPA used a combination of smaller printings of stamp issuances, aggressive marketing, and having famous artists create stamp designs. Still, stamp sales have never recovered to previous levels and today print runs are on the order of 400,000 stamps. Due to these lower printing quantities, the stamps from the late 1990s and 2000s are harder to find on the discount postage market. Although it is rare, some issues have sold out. The most notable of regularly issued UN stamps is the 2005 General Assembly 60th Anniversary Souvenir Sheet, of the one dollar denomination, which is currently being sold by stamp dealers for more than 10 times its original face value.

=== Personalized stamps ===
In 2003, the UN Postal Administration began issuing personalized "UNique" stamps in New York. The sheets have ten or twenty stamps and a large decorative border, with a tab to the right of each stamp where a personal photo is printed. Visitors to the UN Headquarters in New York may use a kiosk to obtain personalized stamps. Most "personalized" sheets are produced for stamp shows and specific UN events with related designs already printed on the tabs. Truly personalized sheets rarely reach the secondary market.

The UN Post Offices in Geneva and Vienna began offering this type of sheet in 2009. Two sheets were produced in 2007 and two in 2008 denominated in Euros. The editors of the Scott Catalog question whether they were ever actually sold at the UN Post Office in Vienna, a primary criterion for recognizing them as a legitimate postal issue. The Scott Catalog lists them as footnotes without assigned catalog numbers.

The UNPA continues to issue stamps, including personalized stamps. It is responsible also for sorting and delivery of mail to the offices under its jurisdiction.

== Archive sale controversy ==
A controversy concerns the 2003 purchase by one organization of the UNPA's entire postal archive, including original artwork and artist's proofs. Apparently this was to raise money for the UNPA, and it may have netted the organization about $2.5 million. However, there have been serious allegations that improper procedures approving the sale were followed. Also, resale of items at several times their initial values have apparently occurred, thus raising more questions about the entire matter. As of 2006 the issue remained under internal UN investigation.
