= Postage stamps and postal history of Austria =

50th anniversary of the Republic issue, showing the coats of arms of Austria and Austrian states, issued in 1968

This article deals with the stamps and postal history of the Austrian Empire, Cisleithania within Austria-Hungary, and the Republic of Austria.

== The historical context ==
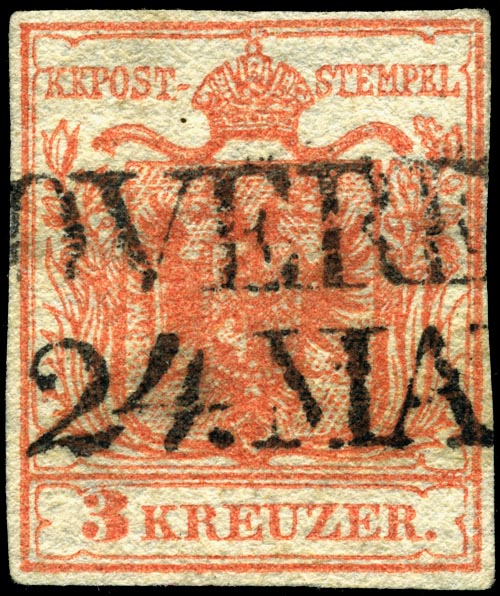
Stamp of 1850 of the KKPost, on handmade paper

The Austrian Empire stamps were first issued on June 1, 1850: a coat of arms under the text KK Post-Stempel. KK is German abbreviation for Kaiserlich-Königlich (Imperial-Royal) as the Habsburgs were indeed Emperor and Kings. The word Austria does not appear.

Territory of the Austrian Empire included current following countries:

- in the north: the Czech Republic, Slovakia and Poland;
- in the East Ukraine and Romania;
- in the South Serbia, Slovenia, Croatia, Montenegro and the north of Italy;
- Austria and Hungary.

The languages used in the empire were German, Italian, Hungarian, Czech, Serbo-Croat, Polish and French (postmark Chargé).

For a better understanding of the historical context, see the article Austria-Hungary.

== Empire (1850–1867) and Dual-Monarchy (1867–1918) ==
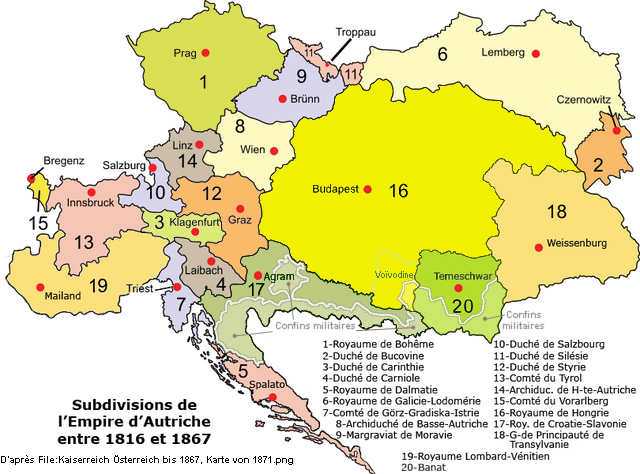
The Austrian Empire, between 1816 and 1867

The first postage stamp issue of the Empire of Austria was a series of imperforate typographed stamps featuring the coat of arms. At first they were printed on a rough handmade paper, but after 1854 a smooth machine-made paper was used instead. Issues between 1858 and 1861 used a profile of Emperor Franz Josef, then switched back to the coat of arms, in an oval frame. Four clichés of the 1850 issue had St. Andrew's crosses printed per pane so that an even multiple of florins were paid per pane sold.

The scarlet Red Mercury (Zinnoberrote Merkur, lit. "vermilion Mercury"), issued on March 21, 1856, is the rarest of the lithographed newspaper stamps authorized on September 12, 1850 which bore Mercury heads but no denominations. The low value blue variety used to frank individual newspapers is the commonest but the higher values in yellow, rose, and scarlet were used on wrappers of bundles of 10 or 50 newspapers and were often discarded.

Franz Josef profiles reappeared in 1867, as a side effect of the establishment of the Austro-Hungarian Empire (at this point Hungary began issuing its own stamps), and continued until 1907, with various changes, including a change of monetary system in 1899 - from 60 kreutzer to the florin to 100 heller to the crown.

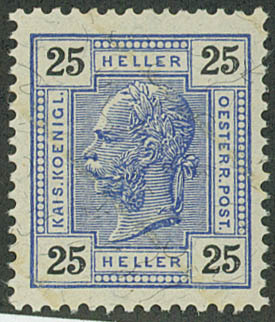
The varnish bars appear faintly on this 1904 issue

1899 also saw the appearance of varnish bars, as diagonal shiny yellowish strips applied to the stamp paper before printing, intended to prevent cleaning and reuse of stamps. The experiment was abandoned with the 1908 issue.

In 1908, Austria issued a series of large pictorial stamps, designed by Koloman Moser, to commemorate the 60th year of Franz Josef's reign, depicting previous emperors, Franz Josef at various ages, Schönbrunn Palace, and the Hofburg (both in Vienna). The designs were reused in 1910 for a Birthday Jubilee issue celebrating Franz Josef's 80th birthday, the dates "1830" and "1910" being added at top and bottom.

A series in 1916 depicted Franz Josef, the Austrian crown, and the coat of arms, and between 1917 and 1919 Emperor Charles I briefly made an appearance on stamps before the republic was established.

=== Austro-German Postal Union ===
On 6 April 1850 the Austro-German Postal Union agreement was concluded between the Austro-Hungarian Empire and Prussia to take effect from 1 July 1850. The primary purpose of the agreement was to provide a uniform system of postal rates. By 1 June 1852 all the remaining German states joined the Union. It subsequently became the model for the creation of the Universal Postal Union in 1874.

== First Republic (1918–1938) ==
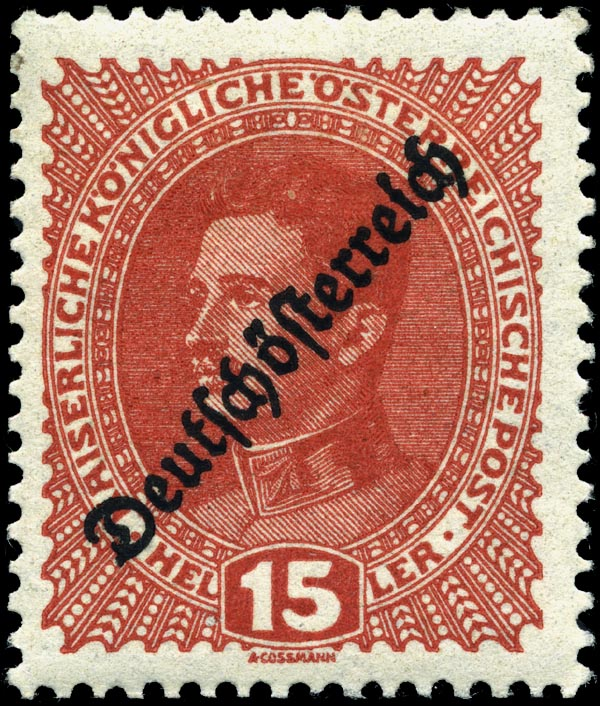
Austrian stamp of Charles I overprinted Deutschösterreich

The first issues of the Republic of German Austria were overprints reading "Deutschösterreich" on stamps of the empire, issued beginning in December 1918.

In 1919 the Republic of Austria issued stamps with new designs; a post horn, the coat of arms, a kneeling man representing the new republic, and the Parliament building, all done in a vaguely Art Nouveau style, and inscribed "DEUTSCHÖSTERREICH" ("ÖSTERREICH" appeared in 1922).

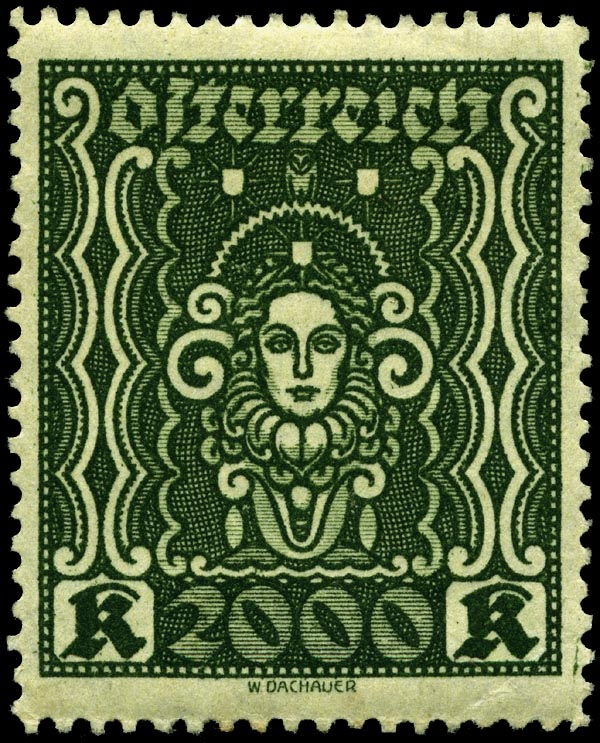
A 2000-kroner stamp of the 1922 "Art and Science" series

However, Austria was caught in the hyperinflation of the early 1920s, and was forced to print new stamps in ever-increasing denominations, topping out at a 10,000 kroner value in 1924. (Even so, Austria was still better off than neighbor Germany, which at that time was issuing stamps of 50 billion marks.)

In 1925, a new monetary system was introduced, 100 groschen to the schilling, which continued in use until replaced by the euro in 2002. New stamps were printed also, featuring numerals (for the low values), a field crossed by telegraph wires, a white-shouldered eagle, and a church of the Minorite Friars. Subsequent issues depicted scenic views (1929), and costumes of various districts (1934). The assassinated chancellor Engelbert Dollfuss was commemorated in both 1934 and 1936.

== Nazi Germany (1938–1945) ==
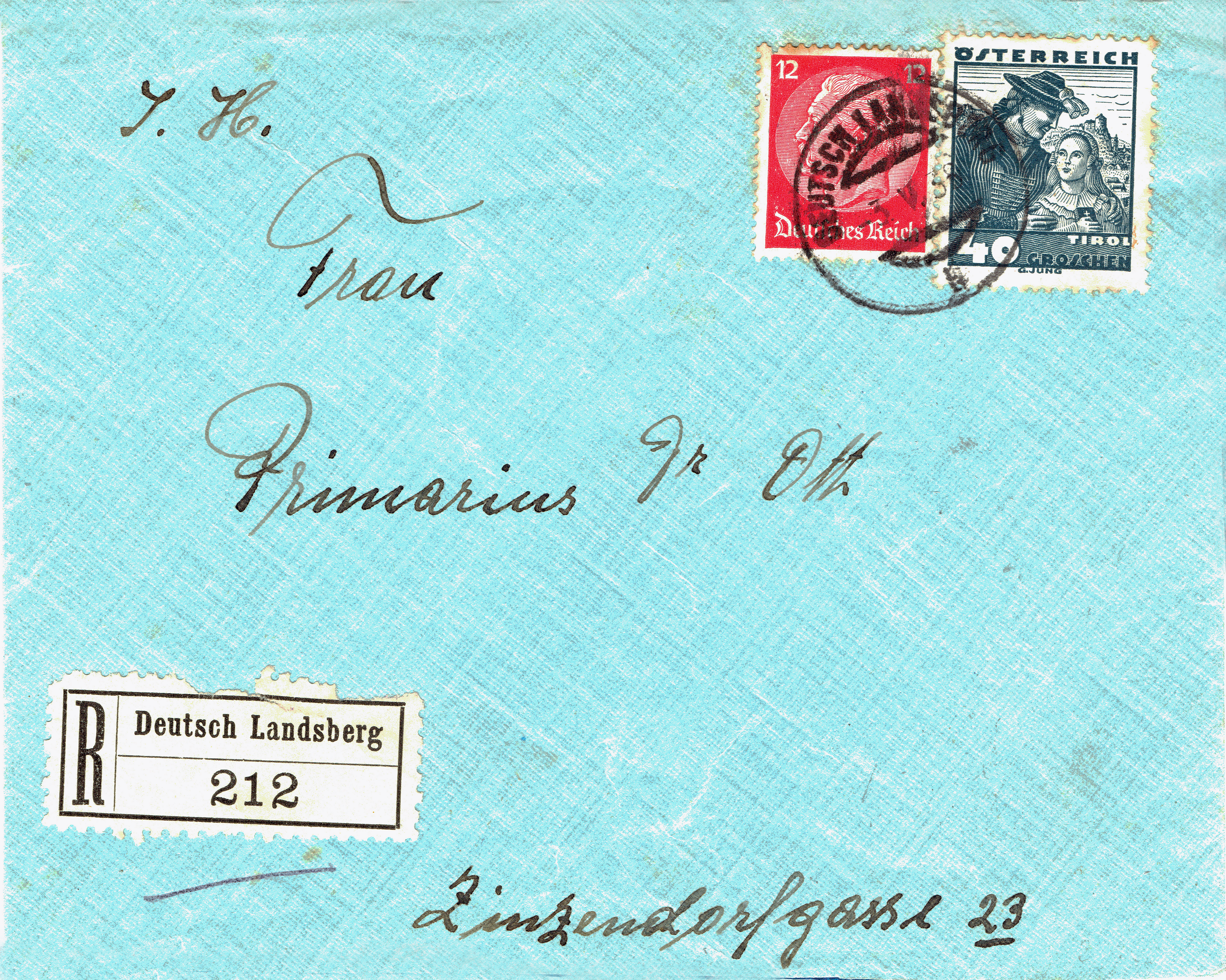
A 1938 cover from Deutschlandsberg to Graz with mixed franking

In 1938, Nazi Germany annexed Austria and incorporated its territory, which put a sudden end to Austria's stamps. Although the entry of German troops in March was sudden, the transition of the postal system took several months; and included a period where German stamps were required in addition to Austrian stamps (a mixed franking). After the transition period was over, Austrians used stamps of Germany until the defeat of Nazi Germany in 1945.

== Allied occupation (1945) ==
The wreckage of World War II included the postage stamp production system, and the Allied occupation forces handled the situation in different ways; the Soviets overprinted German stamps before issuing locally printed stamps, while the American/British/French zone used stamps printed in the United States.

In the Soviet occupation zone, starting on 2 May 1945, the stamps of Germany were overprinted. Initially the overprint consisted of just "Österreich", or "Österreich", and a bar obliterating the "Deutsches Reich" inscription. Hitler's face remained visible, and this was objectionable, so after 4 June postal clerks were expected to blot out Hitler's face manually, until on 21 June a new series of overprints came out with a set of stripes over Hitler. In the meantime, some semi-postal stamps of Germany were also surcharged. In Graz, an additional set of overprints with "Österreich" vertical were issued on 22 May for use in Styria.

New stamps inscribed "REPUBLIK ÖSTERREICH" were issued on 3 July by the Soviet Union, for use in Vienna and surrounding areas, still denominated in German currency.

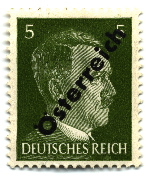
1945 overprint on "Hitler Head" of Germany

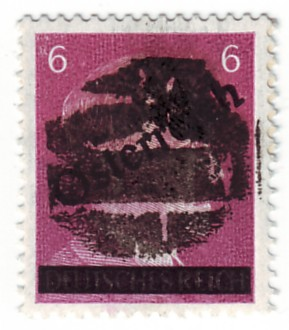
1945 overprint, handstamped

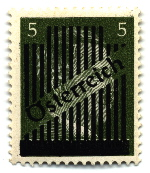
1945 overprint, improved

8pf stamp of the Soviet occupation, used in Vienna 2 August 1945

On the other side of occupied Austria, the Allied Military Government issued a series 28 June depicting a posthorn, for use in areas under Allied occupation (Upper Austria, Salzburg, Tyrol, Vorarlberg, Styria, and Carinthia). These stamps were produced by the Bureau of Engraving and Printing in Washington, D.C., and valid for postage into 1947.

Despite the relatively short period of use, almost all of the occupation-related issues are common and inexpensive to collect today.

== Second Republic (since 1945) ==
General issues produced by the Second Republic became available on 24 November 1945.

Since that time Austria has issued a steady stream of stamps with a variety of subjects, many of them attractively engraved.

== Austria-related issues ==
=== Lombardy-Venetia ===
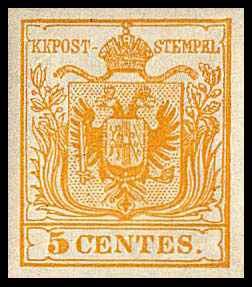
A 1850 stamp of Lombardy-Venetia

Lombardy-Venetia was a kingdom in the north of Italy that was part of the Austrian empire. The inhabitants used the Italian lira for money, so in 1850 the government issued stamps identical to those for the rest of Austria, but denominated in values from 5 to 45 centesimi. The monetary system changed in 1858, 100 soldis to the florin, which required a new issue of stamps, designs otherwise identical to the contemporary Austrian issues. Lombardy was annexed to Sardinia in 1859, and Venetia to the new kingdom of Italy in 1866, at which point the Lombardy-Venetia stamps went out of use.

Because of the early date and limited area, all Lombardy-Venetia stamps are uncommon, especially unused, the cheapest costing US$3 or so. The rarest type of newspaper tax stamp last sold for US$100,000.

=== Italian occupation ===
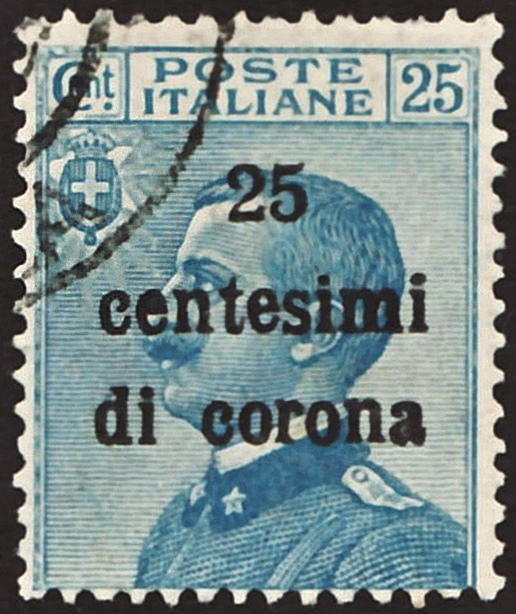
An Italian stamp overprinted for occupied Austrian territories, 1919

Near the end of World War I, Italy captured the Austrian territories of Trentino and Venezia Giulia. In 1918, Italy issued overprinted stamps for these areas. Stamps sold at Trieste were overprinted "Regno d'Italia / Venezia Giulia / 3. XI. 18." on Austrian stamps of 1916, and then just "Venezia / Giulia" on Italian stamps, while in the Trentino the overprint was "Regno d Italia / Trentino / 3 nov 1918" on Austrian stamps and then just "Venezia / Tridentina" on Italian stamps. In January 1919 the Italians issued overprinted stamps for all of the occupied territories, the overprint consisting of, for instance, "5 / centesimi / di corona". This lasted until September, when the Trentino was permanently assigned to Italy and used Italian stamps thereafter, while Trieste became a free city.

=== Austrian post offices abroad ===
During the 19th and early 20th centuries Austria maintained post offices in the Levant (Ottoman Empire) and in Liechtenstein (Balzers and Vaduz, considered domestic post office):

=== Military post ===
Austria-Hungary issued stamps named Feldpost (K.u.K. FELDPOST) in 1915 until 1918 for use in the occupied regions.

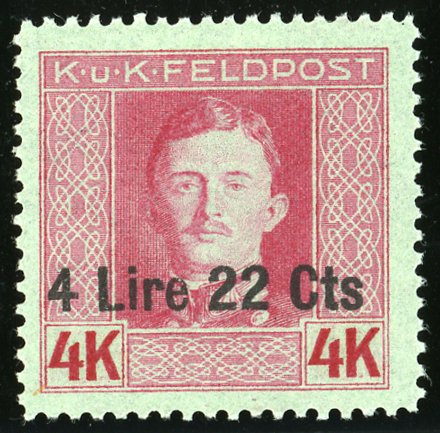
Austro-Hungarian military stamp for use in occupied Italian territories, 1918

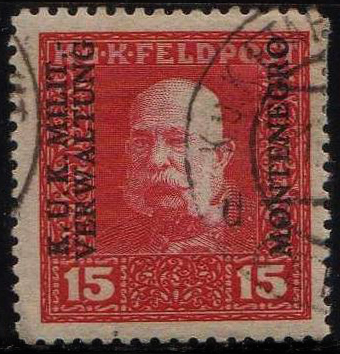
Austro-Hungarian military stamp for use in Montenegro, 1917

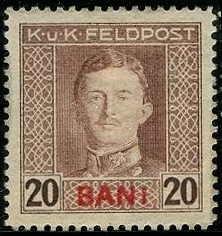
Austro-Hungarian military stamp for use in occupied Romanian territories, 1917

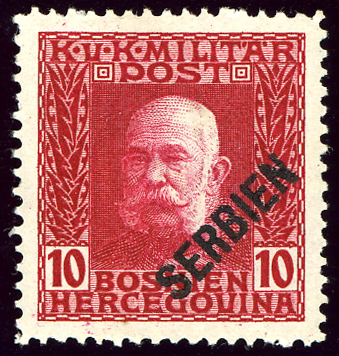
Austro-Hungarian military stamp for use in Serbia, 1916

== Postal stationery ==
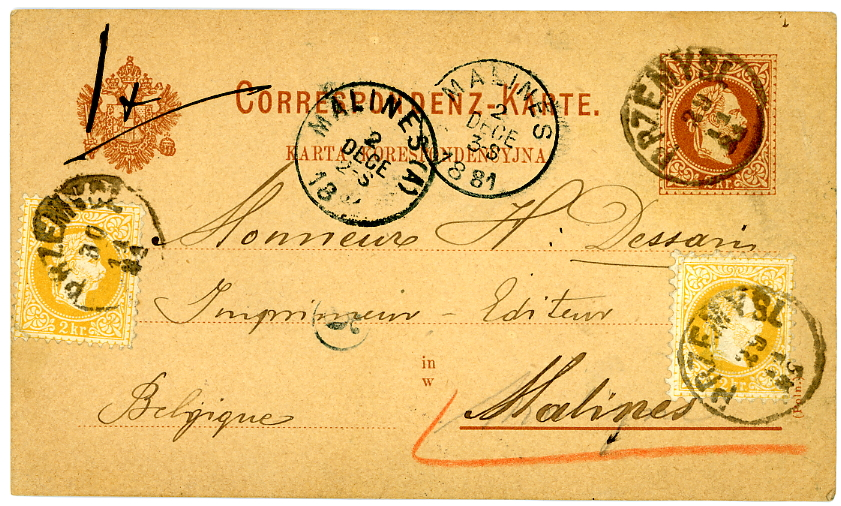
A Polish version postal card sent from Przemyśl, Galicia in 1881

The first items of postal stationery to be issued by Austria were envelopes Briefumschlägen in 1861 followed by postal cards Korrespondenzkarten in 1869 and wrappers in 1872. The concept of Korrespondenzkarten has been invented in 1869 by Emanuel Herrmann. They have been printed in eight languages.

Lettercards were issued in 1886 and aerogrammes were first issued in 1952.

== See also ==
- Edwin Müller
- Marcophily
- Postal history of Hungary

== References and sources ==
Notes

Sources

- Stanley Gibbons Ltd: various catalogues
- Tranmer, Keith, The Postal History of Austria 1938–1946, Austrian Stamp Club of Great Britain, 1972
- Encyclopaedia of Postal History
- Rossiter, Stuart & Fowler, John (1991). World History Stamp Atlas (reprint ed.). Black Cat. ISBN 0-7481-0309-0.
- Zinsmeister, Marian Carne (2006) [1949]. Austrian Stamps and Their Background 1850-1937. reprint by Kessinger Publishing. ISBN 1-4286-6225-1.
