= History of Virginia on stamps =

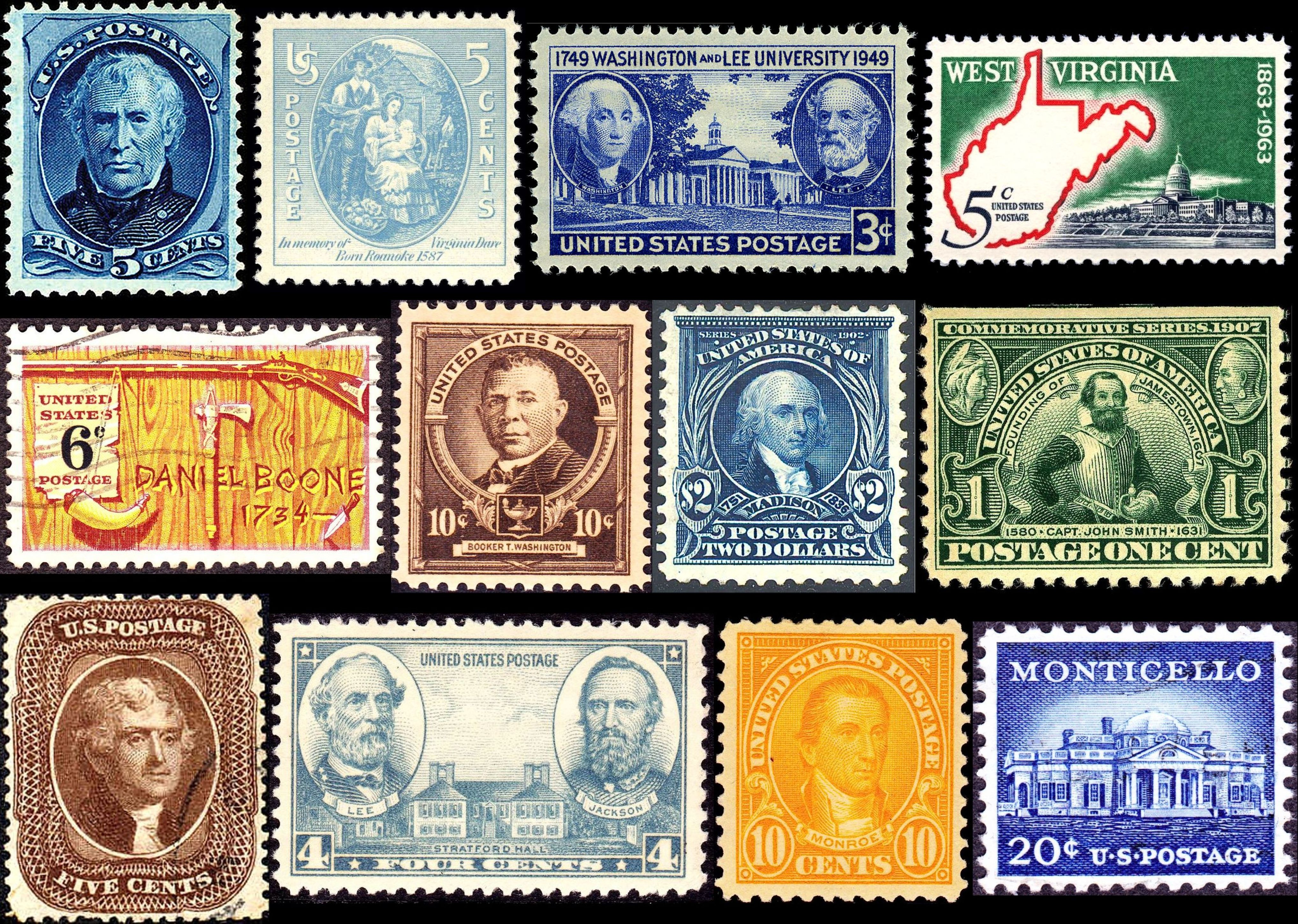
Various historical stamps depicting notable Virginia sites and residents.

The history of Virginia through the colonial period on into contemporary times has been depicted and commemorated on postage stamps accounting for many important personalities, places and events involving the nation's history. Themes are particularly rich in early American and new nation history, historical landmarks, and Virginia-born presidents.

== Commonwealth of Virginia ==
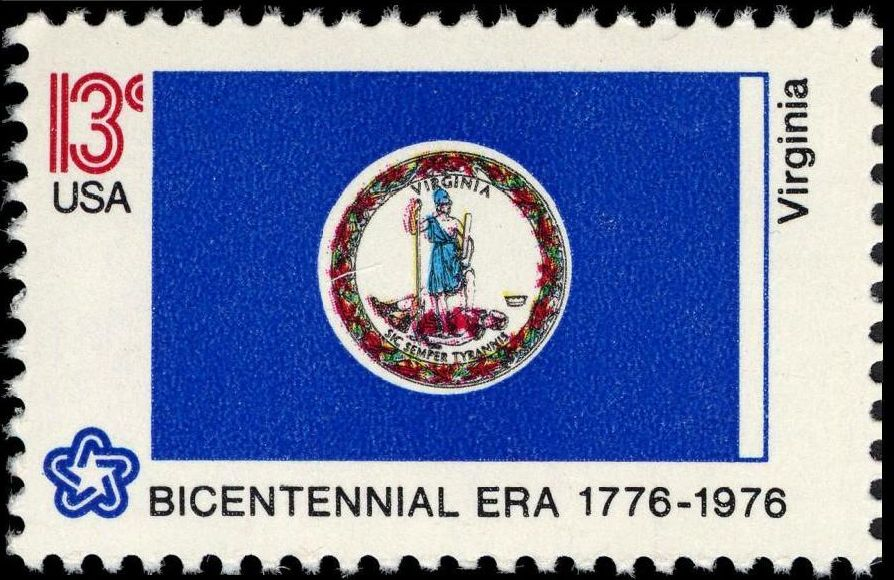
Virginia State Flag, 1976 issue

The Commonwealth of Virginia has been commemorated on stamps in its state flag, state bird and state flower.

The Virginia State Flag represents the Commonwealth of Virginia's love of freedom. It was commemorated on a 13-cent stamp as a part of the American Bicentennial Issue: Flag Series on February 23, 1976. It was the first pane with fifty different stamps ever issued. The design adopted in 1861 is deep blue field containing a circular white center bordered with a garland and the Latin motto "Sic Semper Tyrannis", Thus always to tyrants. The vignette is of two figures, both in ancient warrior garb, acting out the motto. The woman, Virtue, represents Virginia, the fallen tyrant is a man holding a scourge and chain.

- The USPS issued the Virginia cardinal and flowering dogwood stamp on April 14, 1982, as a part of the State Birds & Flowers issue. An image may be seen at the link to Arago online in the footnote.

== Events and eras ==
=== Jamestown and settlement ===
In 1907, the U. S. Post office issued a series of three stamps in honor of the Jamestown Exposition, held that year in Norfolk between April 26 and December 1 to celebrate the 300th anniversary of the Jamestown settlement in 1607. The 1-cent stamp features a portrait of Captain John Smith, promoter and commander, credited with the colony's success. As governor, Smith ended the "Starving Time" with his dictum, "He that will not work, shall not eat." The image is taken from an engraving by Simon de Passe. This stamp paid the one-cent post card rate; 78 million were produced.

The red 2-cent stamp depicts the English colonists' landing, with Smith's ship The Discovery in the background. This issue paid the first-class domestic rate; 149 million were printed. The 5-cent portrays Pocahontas, who was instrumental in the colony's survival: her marriage to John Rolfe of tobacco fame resulted in peaceful relations between the settlers and the neighboring Powhatan tribes throughout her lifetime.

The engraved portrait of Pocahontas is modeled on a likeness by Simon Van de Passe created in 1616, which appeared in a book published by John Smith in 1624. The 5-cent paid large weight and foreign destination rates; about 8 million were issued.

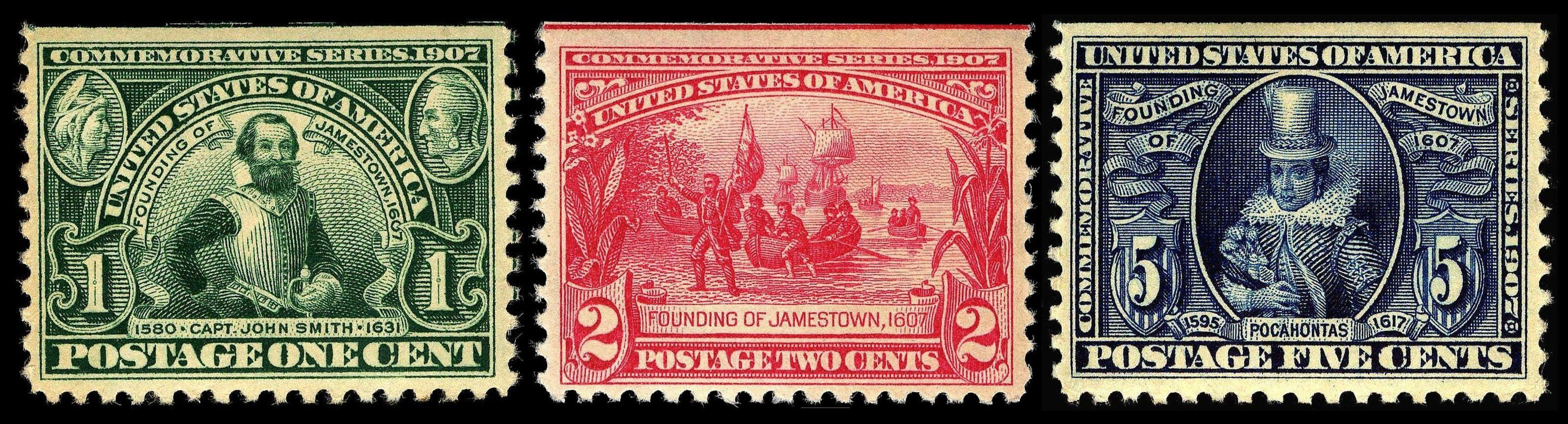
Jamestown Exposition commemorative stamps, 1907 Issue

- Jamestown, Virginia settlement was commemorated on its 400th anniversary with a 41-cent stamp issued on May 11, 2007. The stamp is triangle-shaped as was the original fort located there. The selvage area on the front of 20-stamp sheets showed a painting of early Jamestown by Richard Schlect, reviewed by archeologists then excavating the original site. Banknote Corporation of America printed 60 million in the offset process with microprint "USPS".

Important Virginia colonial women included Virginia Dare, first born English child at Roanoke, the lost colony. A 5-cent postage stamp "In memory of Virginia Dare, born Roanoke 1587" was issued on the 350th anniversary of her birth on August 18, 1587. She was born to Eleanor and Ananias Dare, the first born of European parents on the North American continent. The vignette pictures an idyllic scene with a well clothed family, substantial garden, spinning wheel and garden produce. In reality the colonists lived miserably and were presumed slain by Native Americans. The issue realized a design drawn by President Franklin Delano Roosevelt on White House stationery, faithfully reflecting his accompanying written suggestions that the stamp be baby blue in color and square in shape.

Widow Martha Custis married George Washington enhancing his status as a colonial gentleman, from which he launched his public career. Martha Washington, America's first "First Lady" was also the first American woman to appear on stamps, featured in the series of 1902 on the 8-cent denomination, and later appeared on the 4-cent value in the so-called "Fourth Bureau Issue": the 1922-1931 Series (which comprised 27 stamps). The Fourth Bureau stamp employed an engraving based on a drawing by French artist Charles Francois Jalabert. It was printed on both the flatbed press and the Stickney rotary press and offered in sheet and coil versions.

In the 1938 Presidential Series, Martha Washington on 1 1/2-cent stamp was only one of three non-presidential subjects, and the only woman represented. Her likeness comes from a bust at the Memorial Continental Hall Museum. The 1 1/2-cent rate paid the third class "greeting card" rate in effect from April 1925 to December 1948.

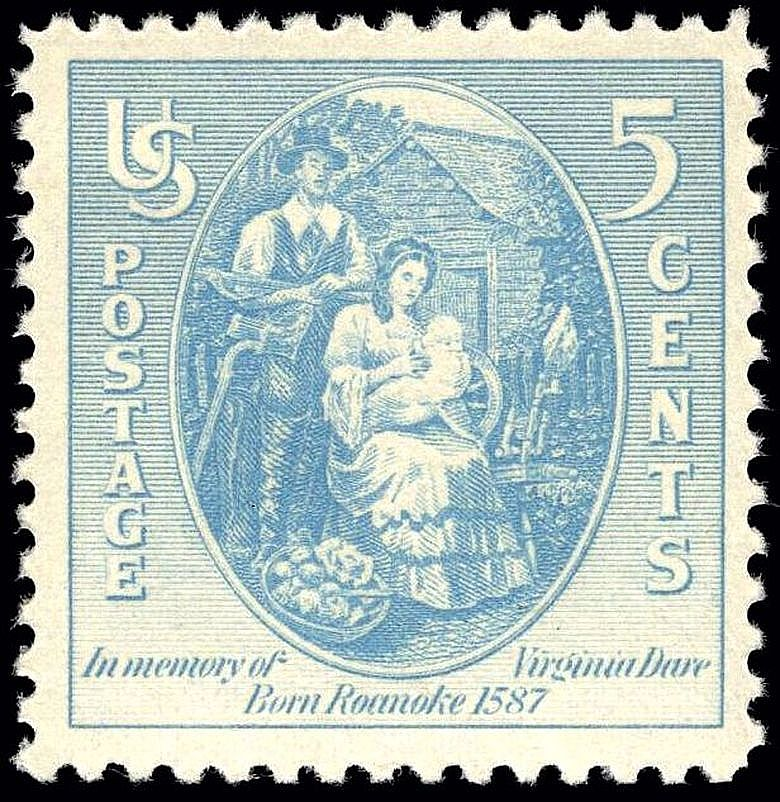
Virginia Dare
1937 issue

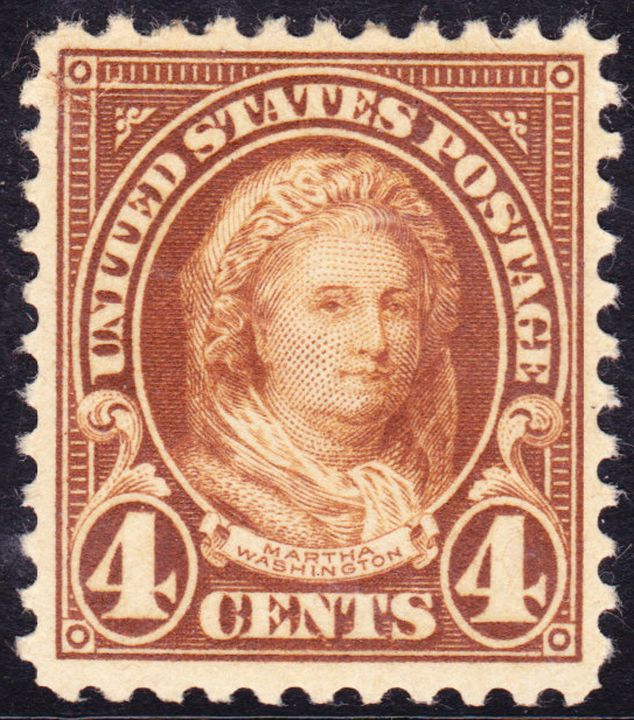
Martha Washington
1923 issue

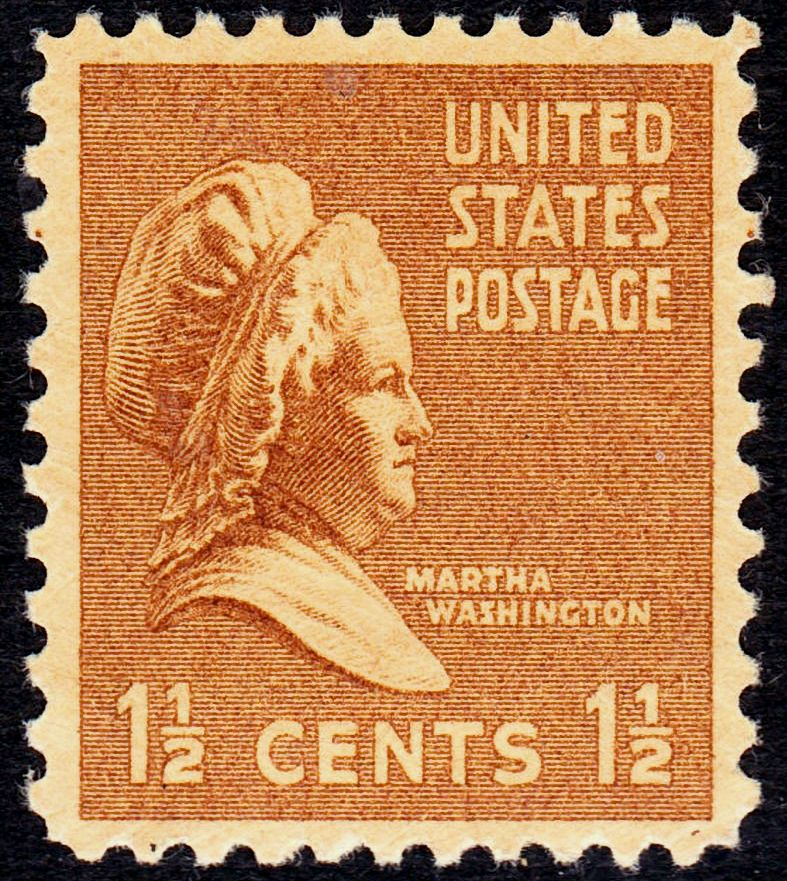
Martha Washington
1938 issue

Daniel Boone was honored with a 6-cent stamp in the American Folklore Series on September 26, 1968, at Frankfort, Kentucky, where he was buried. He was a famous frontiersman in the development of Virginia, Kentucky and the trans-Appalachian west. A wall of roughly-hews boards displays the tools of Boone's trade—a Pennsylvania rifle, a powder horn, and a knife. The pipe tomahawk represents that the Shawnees had adopted Boone. His name and birth date was carved on the wall.

Colonial craftsmen were commemorated in the 8-cent stamps on July 4, 1972, at Williamsburg Virginia. Designed by Leonard Everett Fisher, they depicted glassblowing, silver making, wig making and hat making, all colonial crafts authentically re-enacted at Colonial Williamsburg, Virginia.

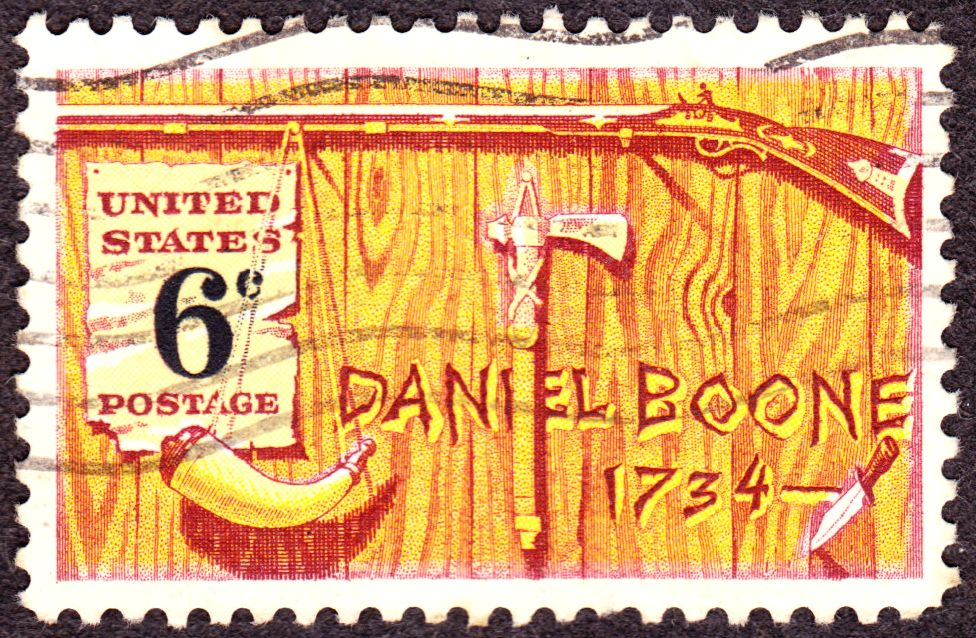
Daniel Boone, 1968 issue

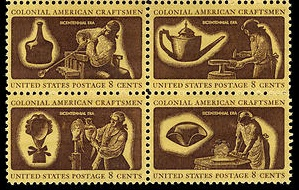
Colonial craftsmen, 1972 issue

=== Revolution and Constitution ===
Revolution

Patrick Henry was a leader in the Virginia House of Burgesses who opposed Britain imposing restrictions on the American colonies. Virginia petitioned the King and Parliament for redress without success. Following his attending the First Continental Congress, Henry's resolves in the second Virginia Convention were published in the Virginia Gazette and widely reprinted in other colonial papers, influencing other colonial legislatures.

Patrick Henry was featured on the 1-dollar value of the Liberty Series issued October 7, 1955. He served as governor for three terms, but is best known for his speech as a delegate, "Give me liberty or give me death." He wrote and published profusely over his lifetime. The portrait by Alonzo Chappel inspired the image of Henry captured in the stamp's "simple picture frame effect".

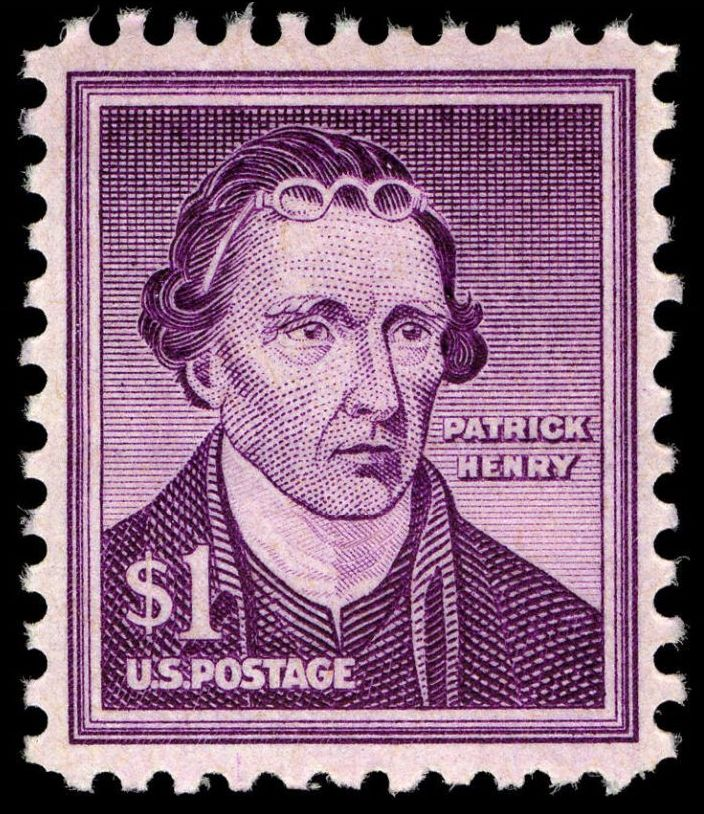
Patrick Henry
1955 issue

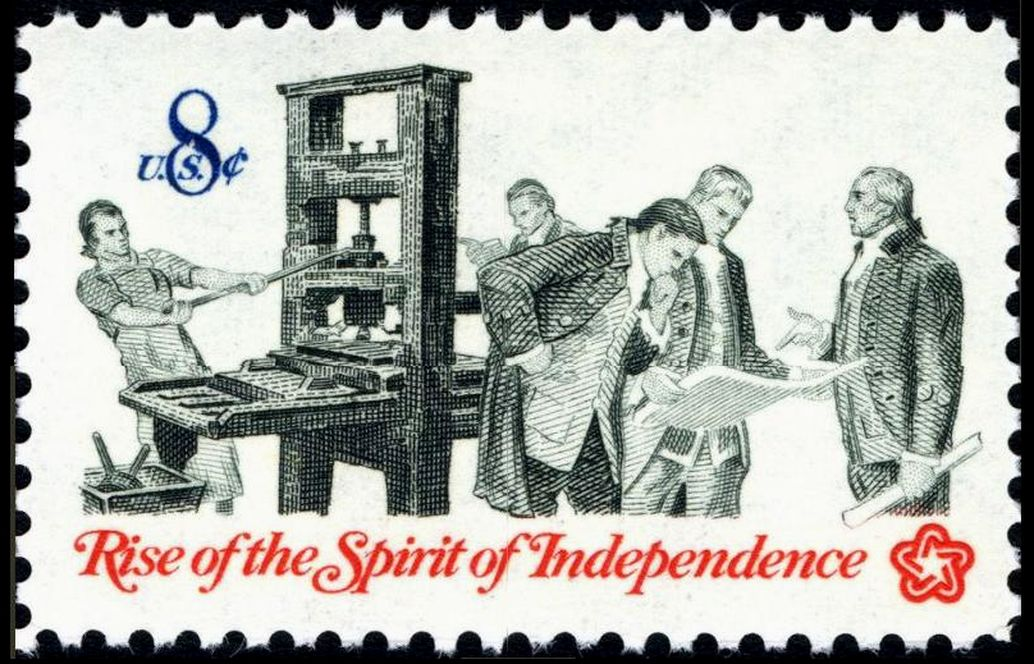
Printer and patriots
1973 issue

Thomas Jefferson, principal author of the Declaration of Independence, was honored with a 5-cent stamp at the onset of the American Civil War. The stamp was used in combinations for postage to France and other foreign destinations. The National Bank Note company printed approximately 175,000 of this Classic Period stamp in several shades. The signing of the Declaration of Independence was commemorated with a 24-cent stamp in 1869. The stamp reproduces John Trumbull's painting in the U.S. Capitol rotunda, in an image 1/300th the size of the original. The National Bank Note Company printed 235,350 stamps of this 24-cent issue. In the Second Continental Congress, George Washington was unanimously elected to lead the Continental Army besieging Boston. He personally commanded campaigns in the north.

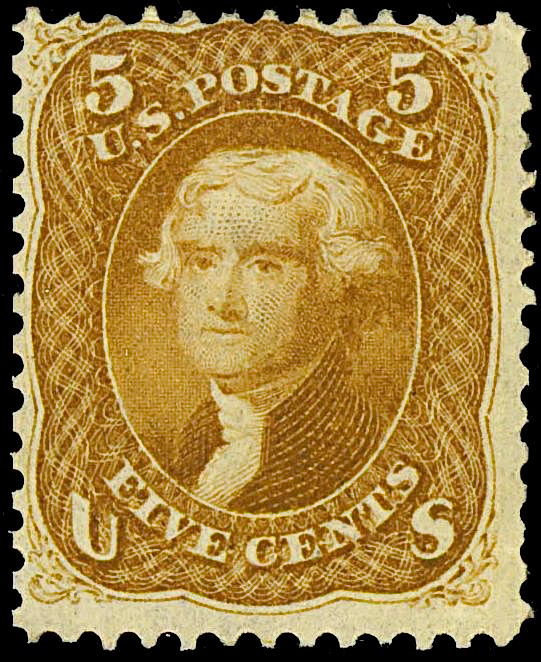
Thomas Jefferson
1861 issue

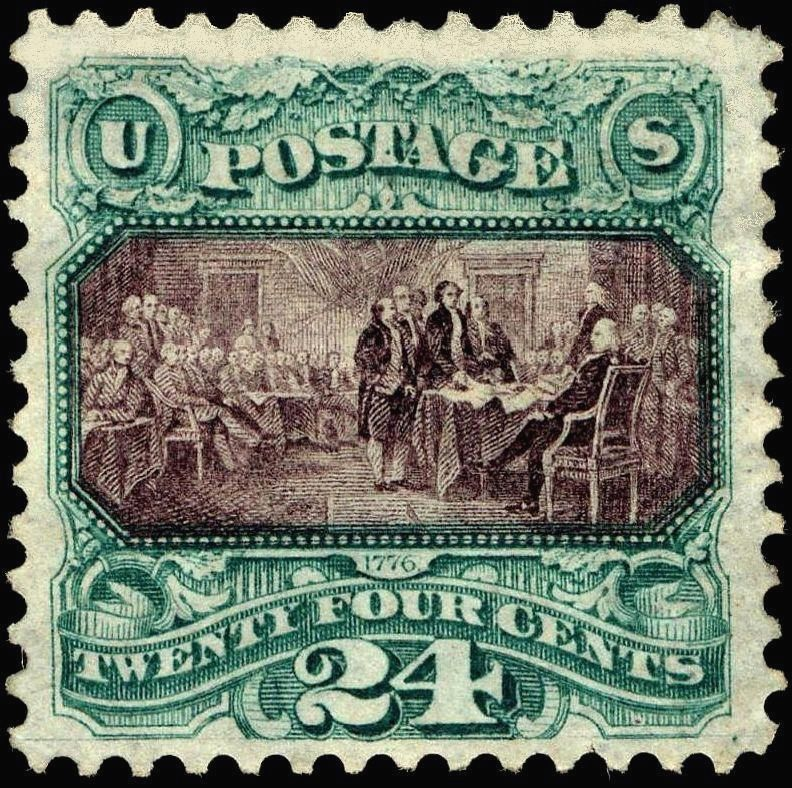
Declaration of Independence
1869 issue

Washington saving his army at Brooklyn was commemorated on a 3-cent stamp at the 175th anniversary on December 10, 1951. The vignette shows Washington directing troops at Fulton Ferry house. Troops in the background are seen crossing the East River.

Major George Rogers Clark commanded Virginia rangers capturing Vincennes in the western theater. The George Rogers Clark issue of February 25, 1929 commemorated the 150th anniversary of the British surrender in 1779 at Vincennes, Indiana. The U.S. conquest of the Northwest Territory led to extending its boundary west to the Mississippi River by the Treaty of Paris (1783). The stamp's vignette was inspired by a painting by Frederick C. Yohn, "Surrender of Fort Sackville".

The climactic battle of the Revolutionary War was the Battle of Yorktown which led to the Treaty of Paris (1783) recognizing U.S. independence by Great Britain. Washington was assisted by French troops under General Rochambeau, guns and a French naval victory under Admiral DeGrasse.

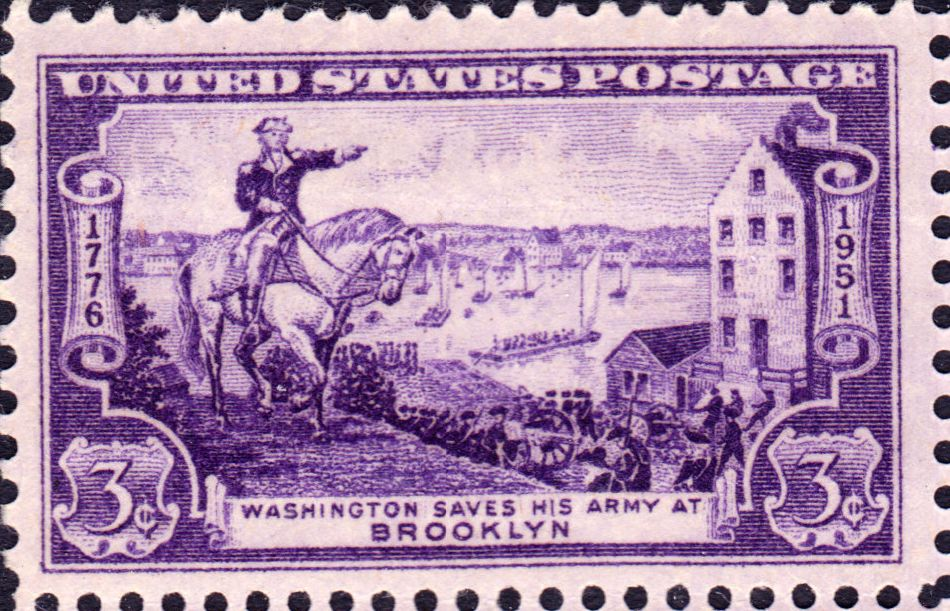
Washington at Brooklyn
1951 issue

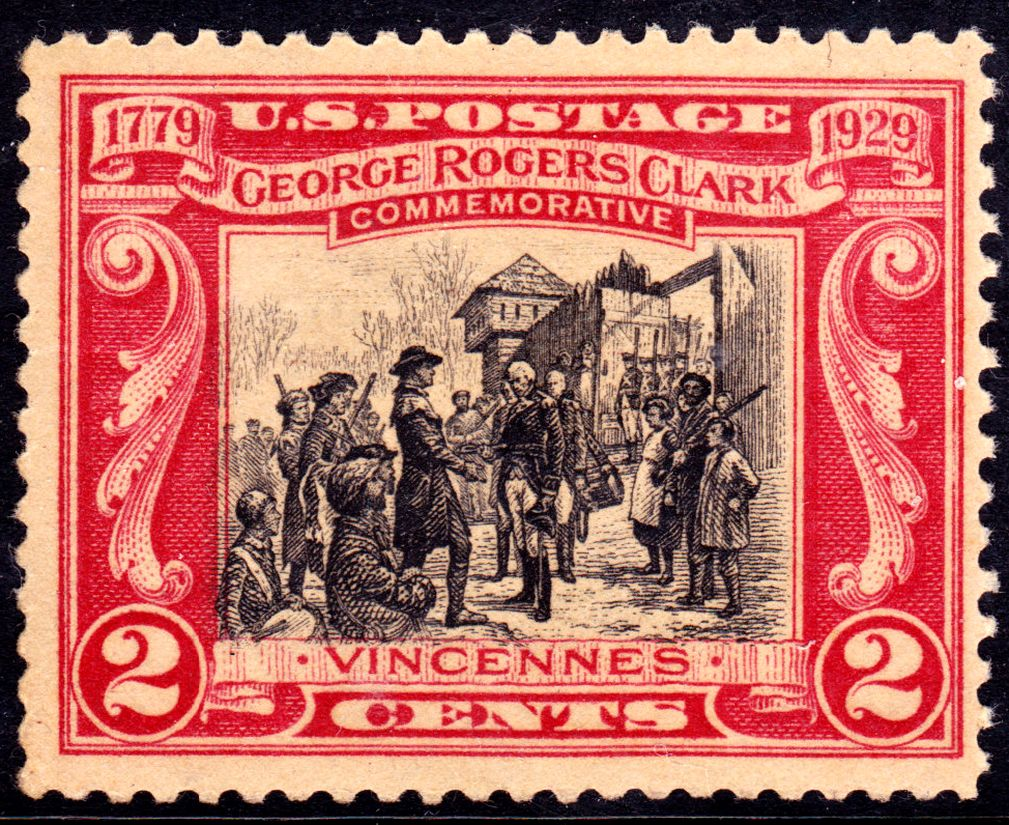
Major George Rogers Clark
1929 issue

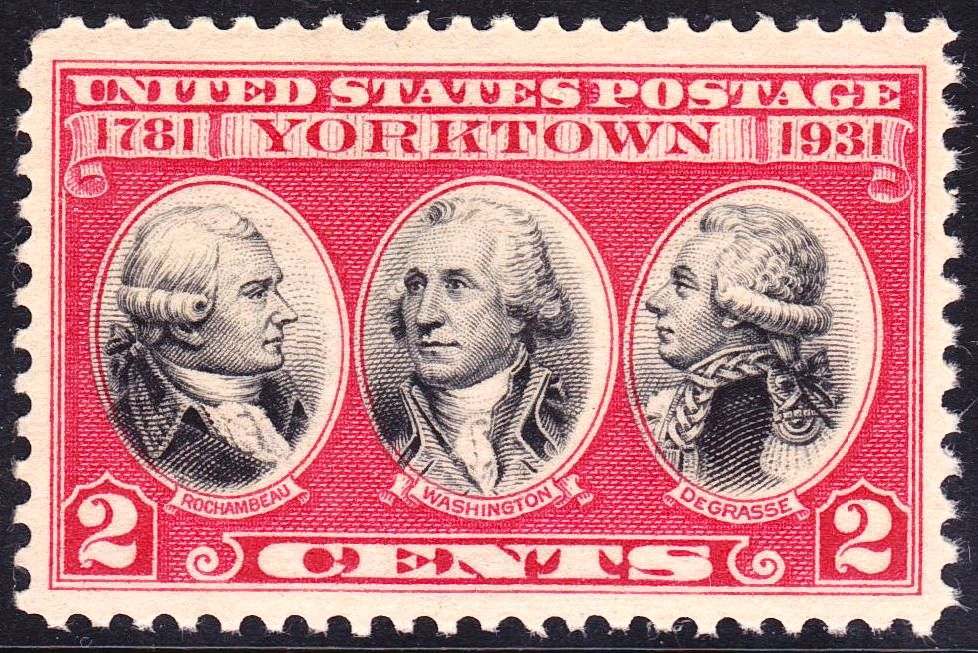
Yorktown
1931 issue

The Revolutionary War in Virginia was commemorated by a pair of 18-cent stamps on October 16, 1981, at Yorktown Virginia. The designer was Cal Sacks of Westport, Connecticut.

- The Battle of the Virginia Capes USPS stamp can be seen at Arago, Virginia Capes 1781 stamp The sea battle was fought September 5, 1781 between the French under Admiral Comte Grasse protecting a supply convoy to Washington, against the British fleet under Admiral Sir Thomas Graves attempting to relieve Cornwallis.
- The Battle of Yorktown USPS stamp can be seen at Arago, Yorktown 1781 stamp. The land battle was a joint operation between General Washington and General Rochambeau laying siege to the British under General Cornwallis at Yorktown. Cornwallis surrendered on October 19, 1781. It was the final battle of the American Revolution.

Constitution and beginnings

The first written U.S. constitution was the Articles of Confederation. Under the Articles, Virginia ceded its claim to territory north of the Ohio River to the United States Government to form the Northwest Territory. There was no independent executive branch or judicial branch, only Congress. The Constitution of the United States was written in an effort to form a more effective national government, with George Washington elected unanimously to be the president of the Constitutional Convention, and James Madison known as the "Father of the Constitution".

The Articles of Confederation 200th anniversary was celebrated with a 13-cent stamp on September 30, 1977. While the Declaration of Independence written by Thomas Jefferson, Virginian Richard Henry Lee moved for "a plan of Confederation". The draft was completed in York Town, Pennsylvania on November 15, 1777, but it was not finally approved until Maryland ratified five years later, after Virginia and other states with western claims ceded territory to the U.S. government. Thomas Nelson Jr. was one of the thirteen committee members appointed in the Continental Congress on June 12, 1776, to "prepare and digest the form of confederation" which led to the Articles of Confederation.

The signing of the Constitution on September 17, 1787. was commemorated on the 150th anniversary in 1937. The design was taken from the Julius Brutus Stearns' painting showing the signers, including Virginians George Washington and James Madison.

Virginia was the tenth state to ratify on June 25, 1788. The 150th anniversary of the U.S. Constitution ratification was celebrated on June 21, 1938, with a 3-cent stamp, dated from the required assent of nine of the original thirteen states. The remaining four states including Virginia, the largest, New York, North Carolina and Rhode Island ratified by 1790, following guarantees that the Constitution would be amended with a Bill of Rights. The stamp depicts the Old Court House in Williamsburg, Virginia, with two riders about to spread the news of Virginia's ratification of the Constitution.

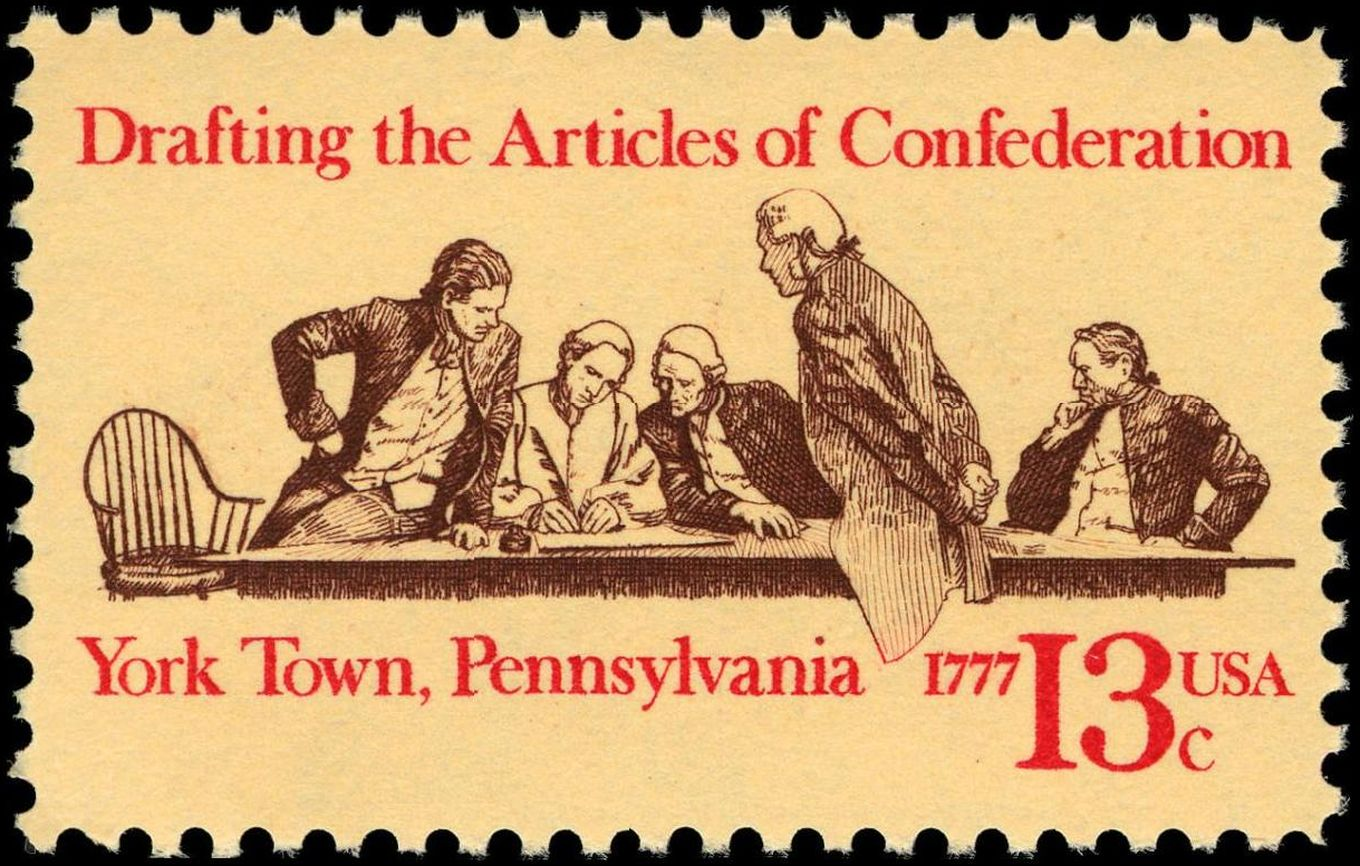
Articles of Confederation 1777-1789
1977 issue

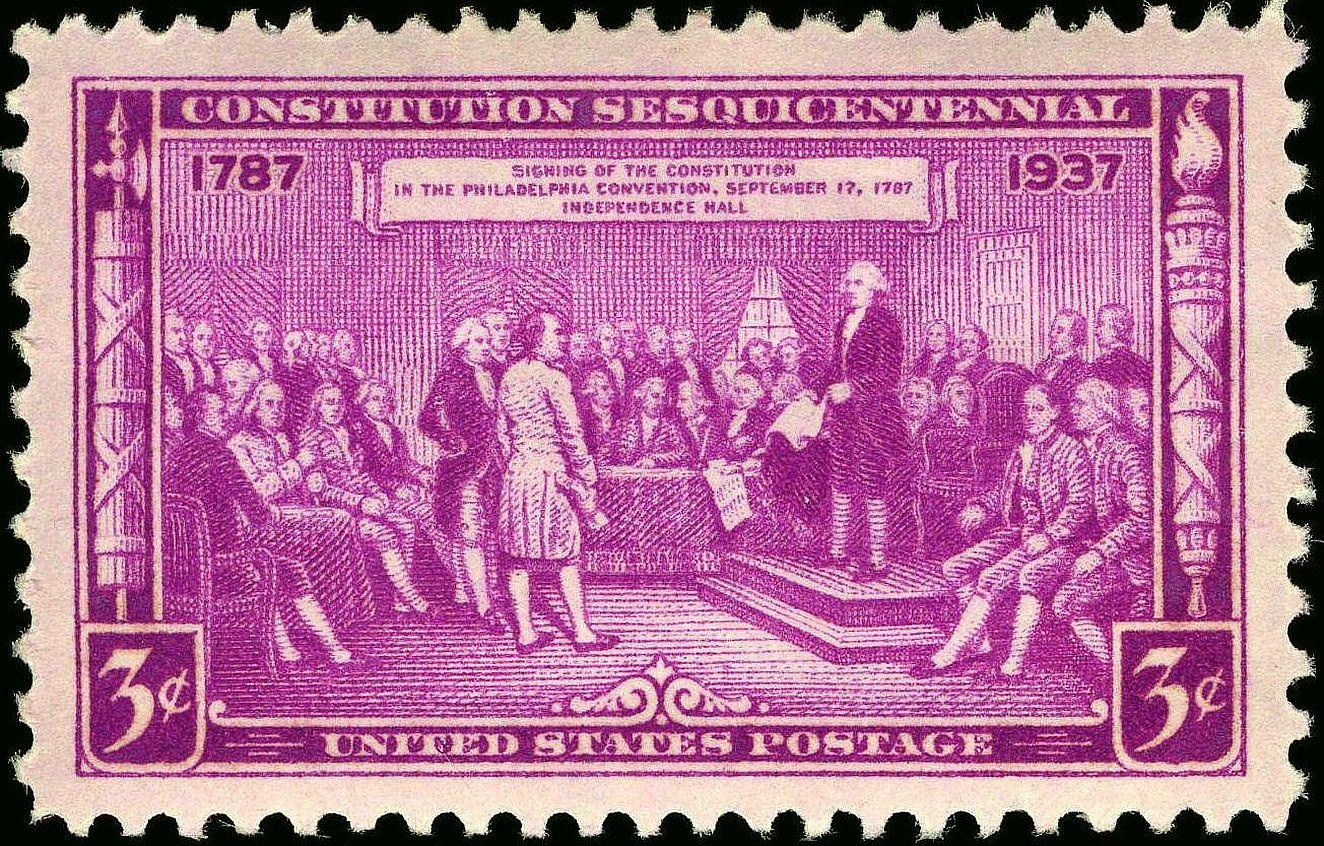
Constitution signing 1787
1937 issue

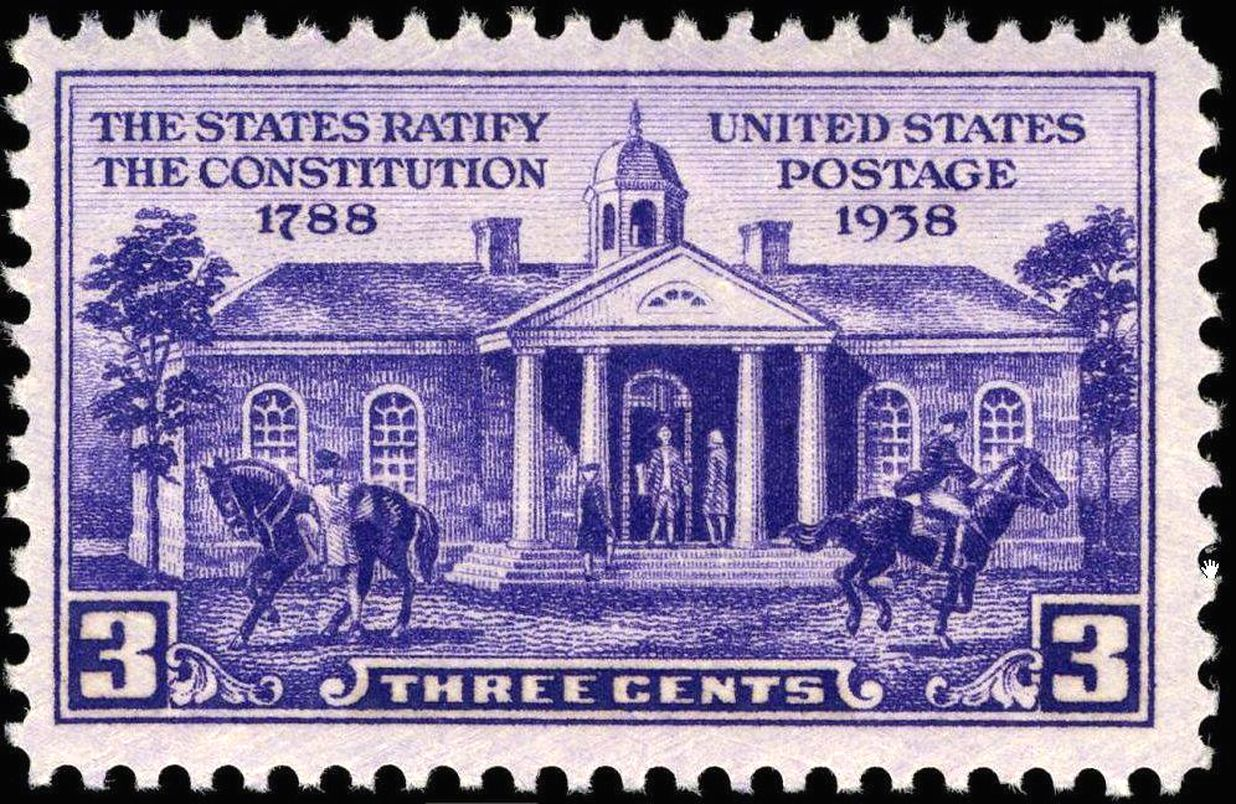
Constitutional ratification 1788
1938 issue

Virginia ratification 1788 1988 issue

Ratification of the Constitution by Virginia was celebrated on June 25, 1988, at Williamsburg, Virginia, on its 200th anniversary. The dedication ceremony was held at the Capitol building featured on the stamp with a horse and carriage in the foreground. The distinctive barbell-shaped building shown in the stamp had allotted the mirror image footprint for the royal governor's council proceedings versus the colonial Virginia legislature.

Virginia was substantially the largest of the thirteen states, with territory cutting west through to the Mississippi River. Without approval of Virginia and New York which likewise cut the other state territories in two, the agreement of the others would have had little effect. Virginia was home to leaders supporting the Constitution such as George Washington and James Madison, and those opposing such as Patrick Henry and George Mason. Only after a promise for a Bill of Rights did Virginia narrowly ratify. In the First Congress, James Madison introduced the first nine, and the tenth was introduced by another Virginian, Richard Henry Lee.

Pierre Mion of Lovettsville, Virginia, designed the stamps. They were engraved in the offset/intaglio process by the Bureau of Engraving and Printing, and issued in panes of fifty.

Setting up new government

In March 1789, Washington was sworn in as the first president of the U.S., having been elected unanimously by the Electoral College. Four of the first five presidents were from Virginia. George Washington was the first, the "Father of his country". He was followed by his Vice President John Adams.

Washington's presidential inauguration in 1789 was celebrated on its 150th anniversary in 1939. It took place at Federal Hall in New York City, the first capital under the new Constitution for one year before it was moved to Philadelphia and then finally to Washington, D.C. Washington had been elected unanimously the commander in chief of the Continental Army, president of the Constitutional Convention, and President of the United States twice. He played a pivotal role in the early United States history. The Post Office produced over 72.7 million of the issue.

James Madison was the floor leader in the House of Representatives who shepherded the Bill of Rights through Congress and out to the states for ratification; he is known as the "Father of the Bill of Rights".

The Bill of Rights (1791) 175th anniversary was celebrated on July 1, 1966, with a 5-cent stamp. The shield-shaped design shows two hands in conflict. The right gauntleted fist suggest the "knock on the door at night" of tyranny. The left held up in opposition symbolizes the guarantees of individual freedoms in the Bill of Rights. The designer was Pulitzer prize winner Herbert L. Block, better known as the Washington Post's cartoonist "Herblock". The stamp was printed on the Giori press with an initial issue of 115 million.

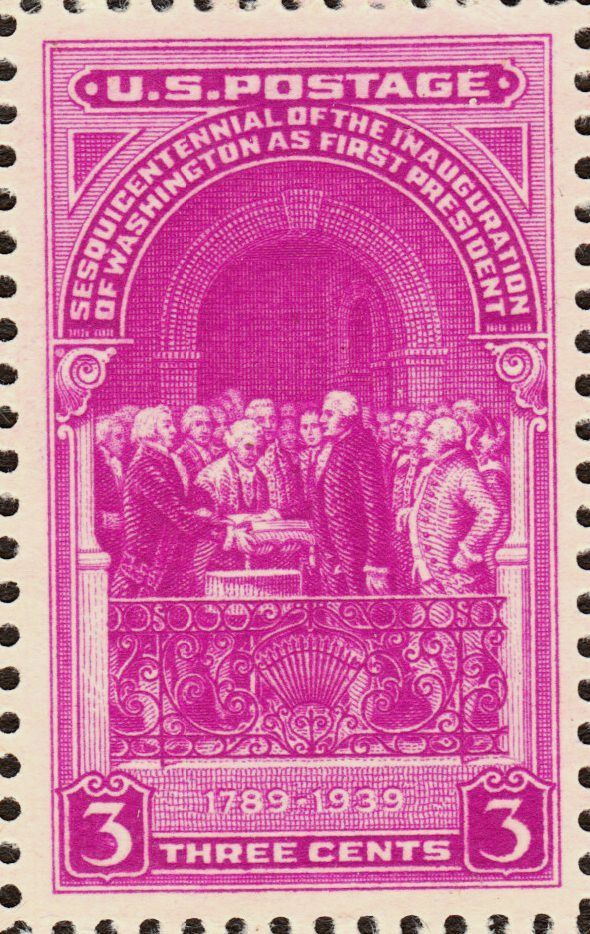
Washington's oath 1789
1939 issue

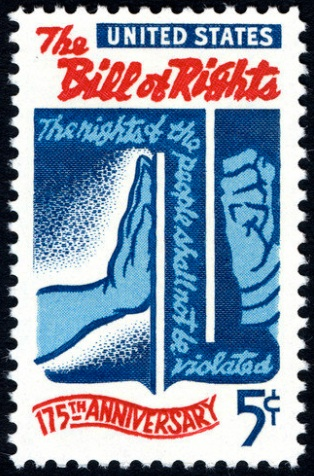
Bill of Rights 1791
1966 issue

- George Mason was honored with an 18-cent stamp on May 7, 1981. Mason refused to sign the Constitution in the Convention of 1787; his criticism of the document in the Virginia Ratification Convention led to the adoption of the Bill of Rights nationally. Previously he had drafted the Virginia Declaration of Rights. An image of the USPS stamp may be seen at the link to Arago online in the footnote.
- The drafting of the Bill of Rights in 1789 was commemorated on its 200th anniversary on September 25, 1989, in Philadelphia, Pennsylvania. This was the fifth stamp in the Constitution Series. George Mason opposed the Constitution for its lack of personal guarantees, James Madison argued liberties were inherently guarded in the Constitution. Following the state Ratification Conventions, Madison began to draft the original Bill of Rights in the First Congress from 200 state proposals. A dozen final proposals passed Congress, and ten of them were ratified by the states to become the Bill of Rights. An image of the USPS stamp may be seen at the link to Arago online in the footnote.

== New Nation ==
The Virginia Dynasty and John Marshall

Then for six presidential terms in a row, "The Virginia Dynasty" governed the U.S. with three successive presidents of two terms each: Thomas Jefferson, the author of the Declaration of Independence, James Madison the father of the Constitution and James Monroe, president of the Monroe Doctrine negotiated by John Quincy Adams as his secretary of state.

Thomas Jefferson was honored with a "breakaway" 5-cent stamp in the 1851–1861 Issue, the first U.S. stamp not depicting Benjamin Franklin or George Washington. The image was inspired by a portrait by Gilbert Stuart, engraved by Toppan, Carpenter, Casilear & Co. It was the last imperforate stamp issued by the company, issued in 1856. It was used primarily for foreign destinations, especially France. Beginning in mid 1857, perforated versions of this stamp were produced in at least six color-variants with two types of frames.

James Madison, the fourth U.S. president, is honored on the 2-dollar Second Bureau Issue stamp 1902–1908. He was a leader in the colonial Virginia Assembly and participated in framing the Virginia Constitution of 1776. He served in the Continental Congress and in the Constitutional First Congress framed the Bill of Rights. Secretary of State under President Jefferson, his own presidency saw the War of 1812. The stamp was designed by R. Ostrander Smith from a painting by an unknown artist. The 2-dollar Madison was used for large, foreign letter rate parcels. In World War I the stamp was re-issued to meet the demand for postage for machine parts mailed to Russia.

James Monroe, the fourth president of the United States, was first honored on a 3-cent U.S. postage stamp on April 30, 1904, as a part of the Louisiana Purchase Exposition Issue. Appointed by Jefferson, Monroe helped negotiate the Purchase from Napoleon, and subsequently served as Madison's secretary of state before becoming president and initiating the Monroe Doctrine with his secretary of state, John Quincy Adams, Monroe's successor as president.

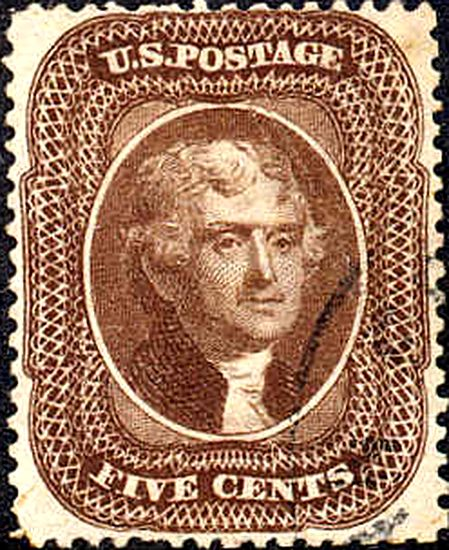
Thomas Jefferson 1801-1809
1856 issue

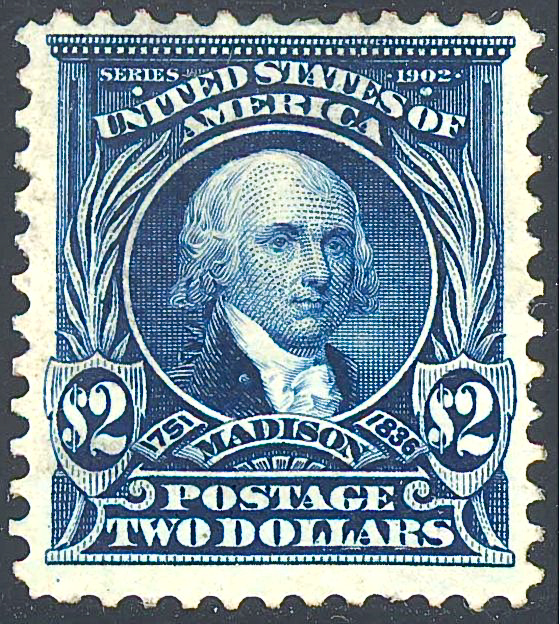
James Madison 1809-1817
1903 issue

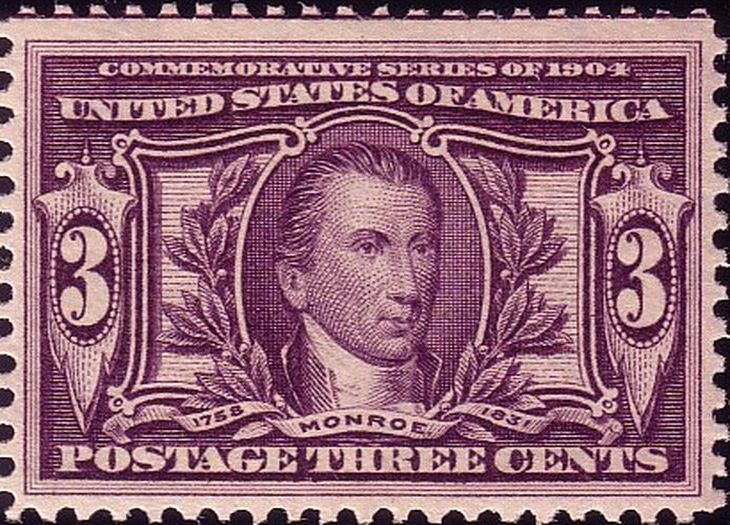
James Monroe 1817-1825
1904 issue

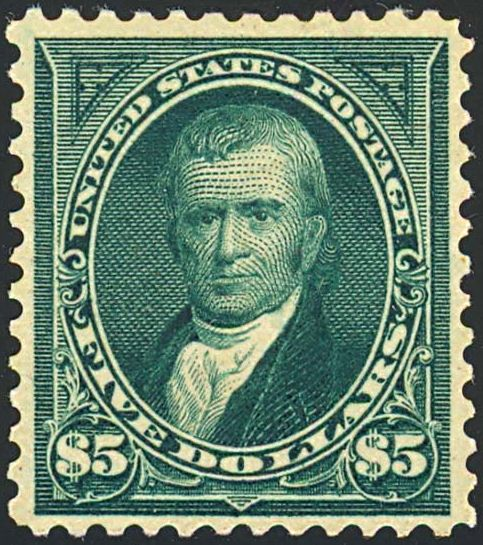
John Marshall 1801-1835
1894 issue

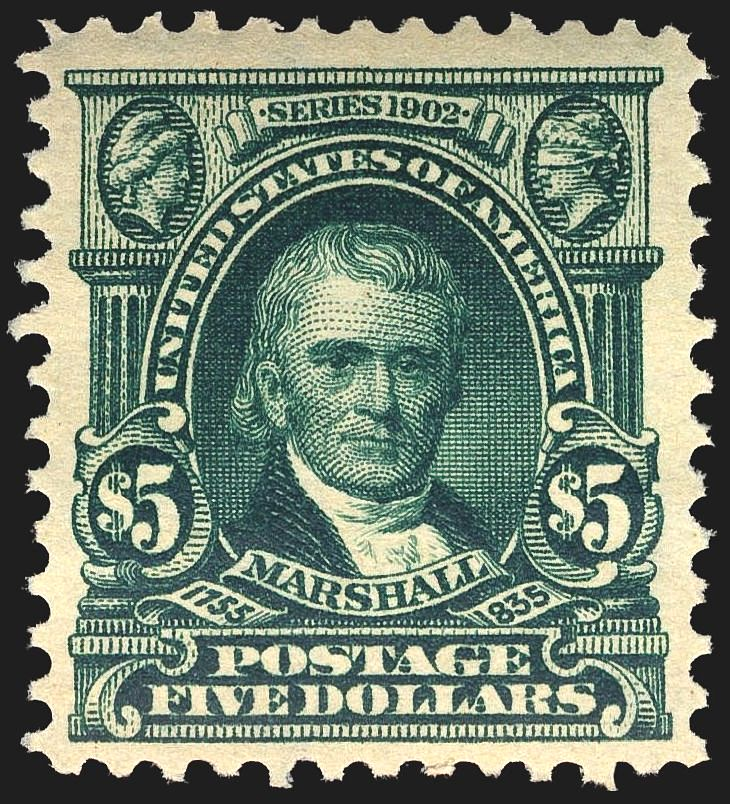
John Marshall 1801-1835
1903 issue

John Marshall was a veteran of the Revolutionary War, delegate to Virginia's Ratification Convention for the Constitution, an advocate for a strong judiciary and the fourth chief justice of the Supreme Court, appointed by Federalist John Adams. He is credited with establishing the federal judiciary as a co-equal branch of government under the new Constitution during his tenure as chief justice from 1801 to 1835 including the important cases of Marbury v. Madison for judicial review, McCulloch v. Maryland for federal supremacy, Gibbons v. Ogden for state monopolies and Dartmouth College v. Woodward for contracts. The 1894 First Bureau Issue for John Marshall was a new design. The $5 was used for overseas bulk rates or internal Post Office accounting. The Second Bureau Issue of 1903 was designed by R. Ostrander Smith from a painting by William James Hubard.

=== Growth of the nation ===
Virginia played important roles in the growth of the United States, both by ceding territory and a new state to the nation, and by providing leadership and out-migrant population moving west.

Early growth

Following the Peace of Paris, the U.S. grew internally, first by territories that would become states in the Ordinance of 1787. Virginia ceded its colonial charter claims to the lands north of the Ohio River. The Northwest Territory as defined by the Ordinance of 1787—that is, the U.S. lands recognized in the Treaty of Paris (1783) north of the Ohio River and east of the Mississippi—was commemorated on its 150th anniversary with a stamp issued on July 13, 1937. On establishing the territory, the ordinance banned slavery and specified that land would be purchased from Indians and then offered for sale by the U.S. government. It also provided for territorial government and eventual statehood. British-Indian unrest continued in the contested area until the battle of Fallen Timbers in 1794. The stamp features a political map of the area denoting state and territorial outlines, flanked by portraits of Manasseh Cutler who drafted the ordinance, and Rufus Putnam, superintendent of settlement in the Territory.

With the new Constitution, Virginia petitioned Congress to admit Kentucky from its western territory as a separate state to the Union in 1792. Kentucky's admission to the Union was celebrated on its 150th anniversary with a 3-cent stamp on June 1, 1942. The stamp's vignette was inspired by a mural by Gilbert White in the State Capitol at Frankfort. Virginia explorer Daniel Boone and his companions are overlooking the Kentucky River opposite the site of modern-day Frankfort.

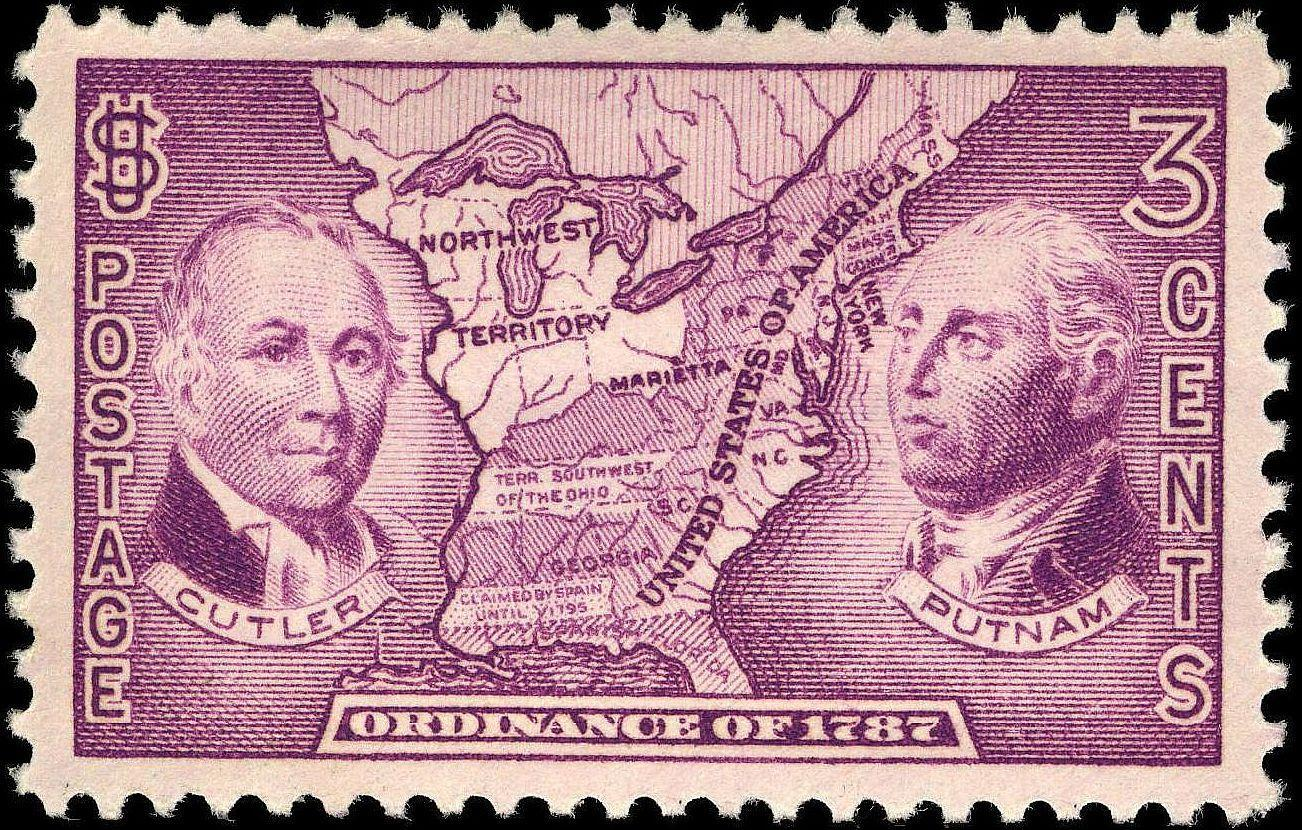
Ordinance of 1787
1937 issue

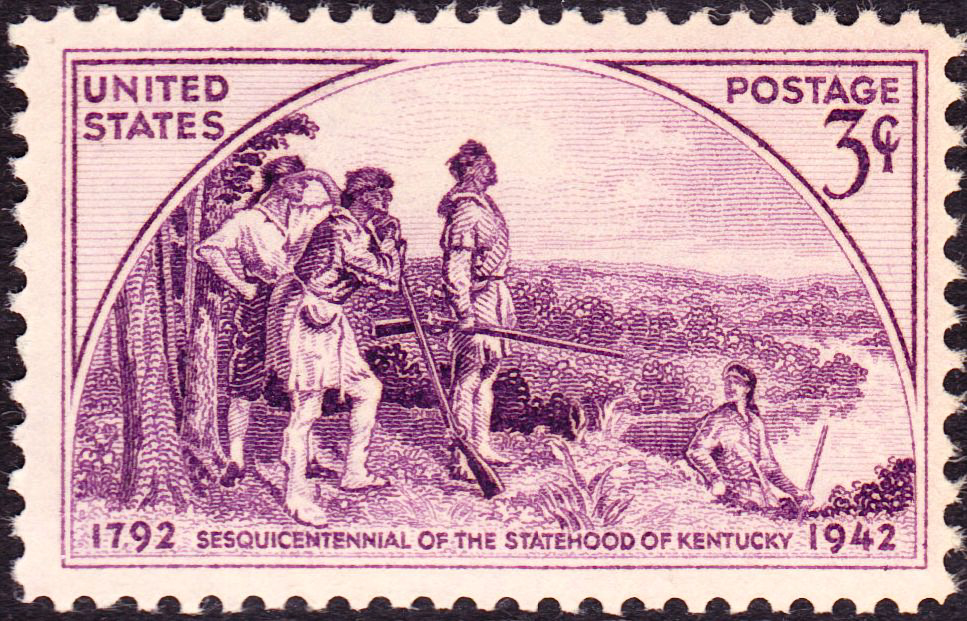
Kentucky statehood
1942 issue

Louisiana Purchase

James Monroe was one of the negotiators in Paris for the Louisiana Purchase, which doubled U.S. Territory under the presidency of Thomas Jefferson. Madison made Monroe his secretary of state. Virginians Meriwether Lewis and William Clark explored the Purchase Territory and west to the Pacific Ocean on the Lewis and Clark Expedition.

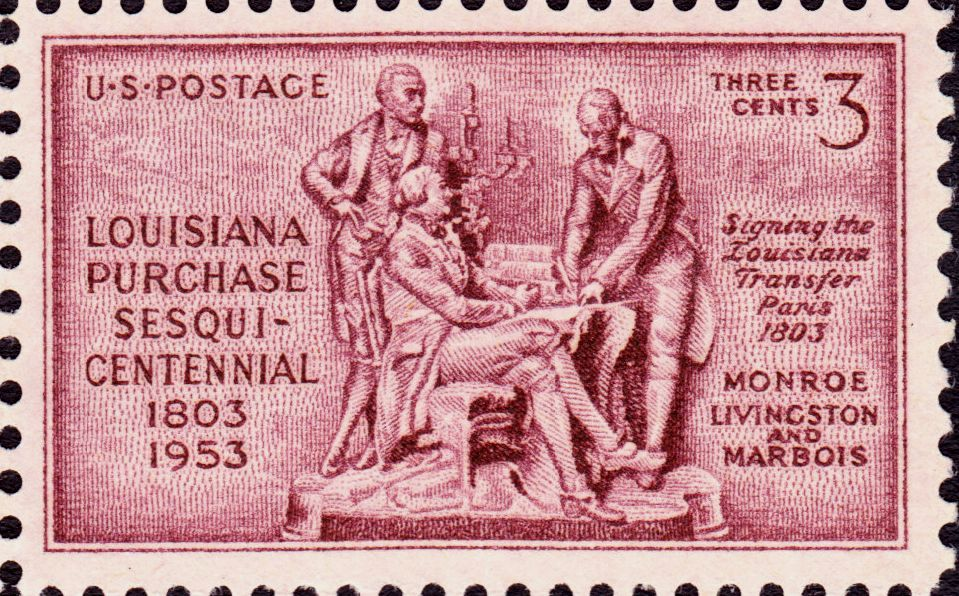
Purchase negotiation, J. Monroe
1953 issue

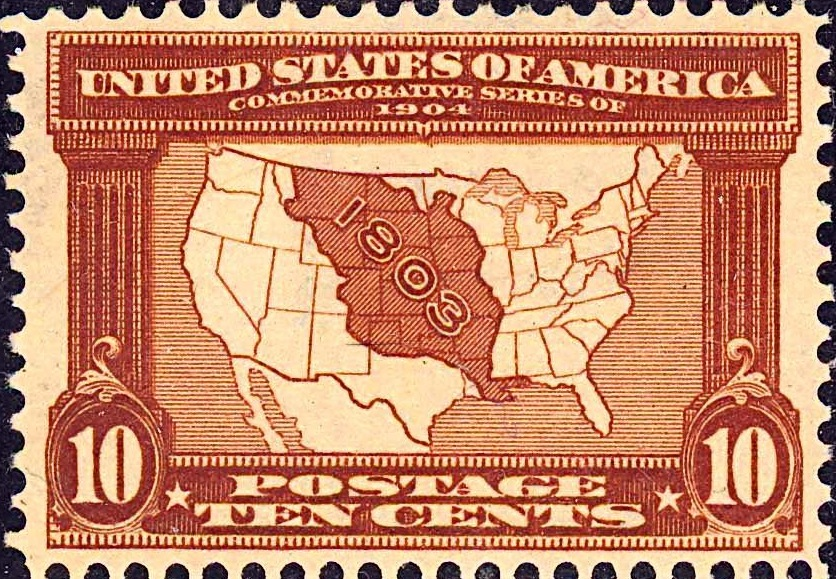
Louisiana Purchase
1903 issue

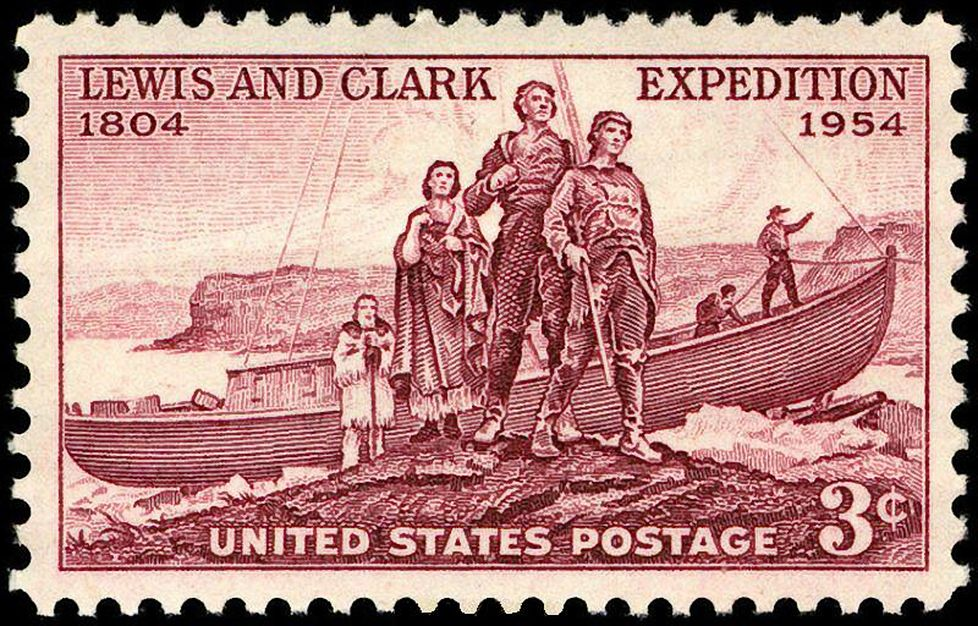
Lewis and Clark
1954 issue

- Louisiana Purchase Bicentennial was commemorated with a 37-cent stamp issued on April 30, 2003, in New Orleans, Louisiana. The Purchase doubled the size of the United States, it became one of the largest countries in the world, and the most fertile lands of the continent were opened to American settlement. It is often called the greatest real estate deal in history, "with a stroke of a pen". The stamp was designed by Richard Sheaff and illustrated by Garin Baker. Sennett Security Products printed the stamp in gravure process in pressure-sensitive panes of twenty; 54 million were issued. An image of the stamp is available at Arago online at the link in the footnote.
- The Lewis and Clark Expedition was celebrated on May 14, 2004, the 200th anniversary of its outset depicting the two on a hilltop outlook. Two companion 37-cent stamps showed portraits of Meriwether Lewis and William Clark. A special 32-page booklet accompanied the issue in eleven cities along the route taken by the Corps of Discovery. An image of the stamp can be found on Arago online at the link in the footnote.

Westward migration

Virginia was not only the mother of presidents, it was the mother of states by its large out-migration in the first half of the nineteenth century. Although a majority of Virginia out-migration was to western border and northern states, both Texas leaders Sam Houston and Stephen Austin were from Virginia.

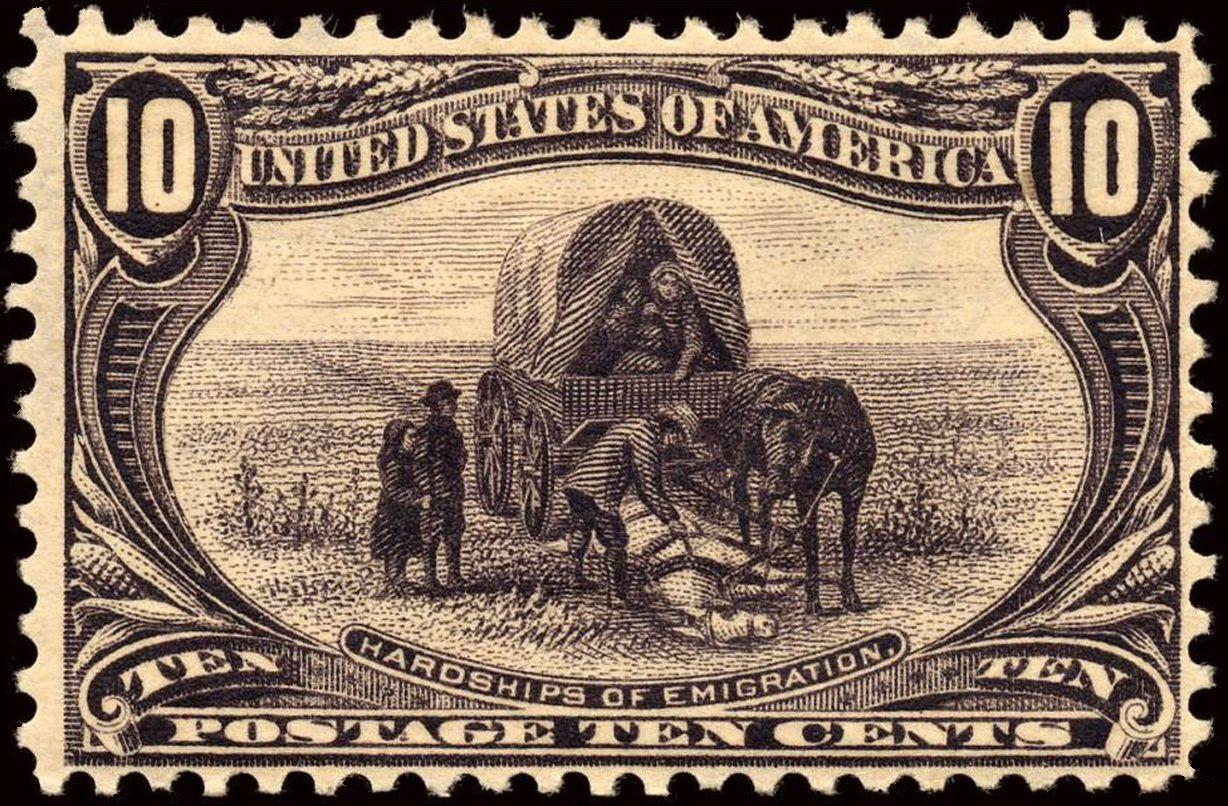
Hardships of emigration
1898 issue

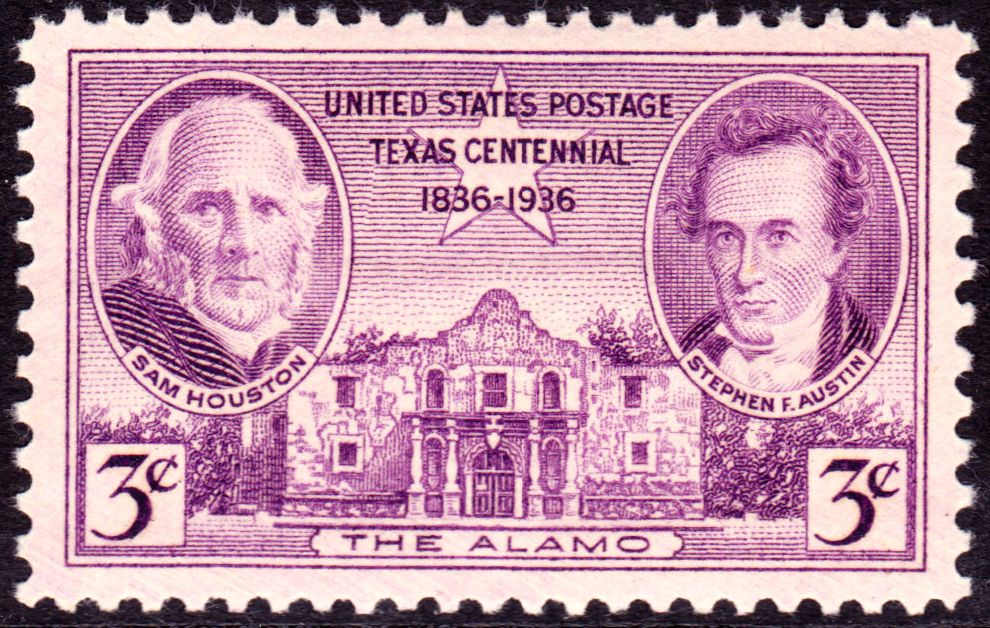
Sam Houston, Stephen Austin
1936 issue

Mexican American War

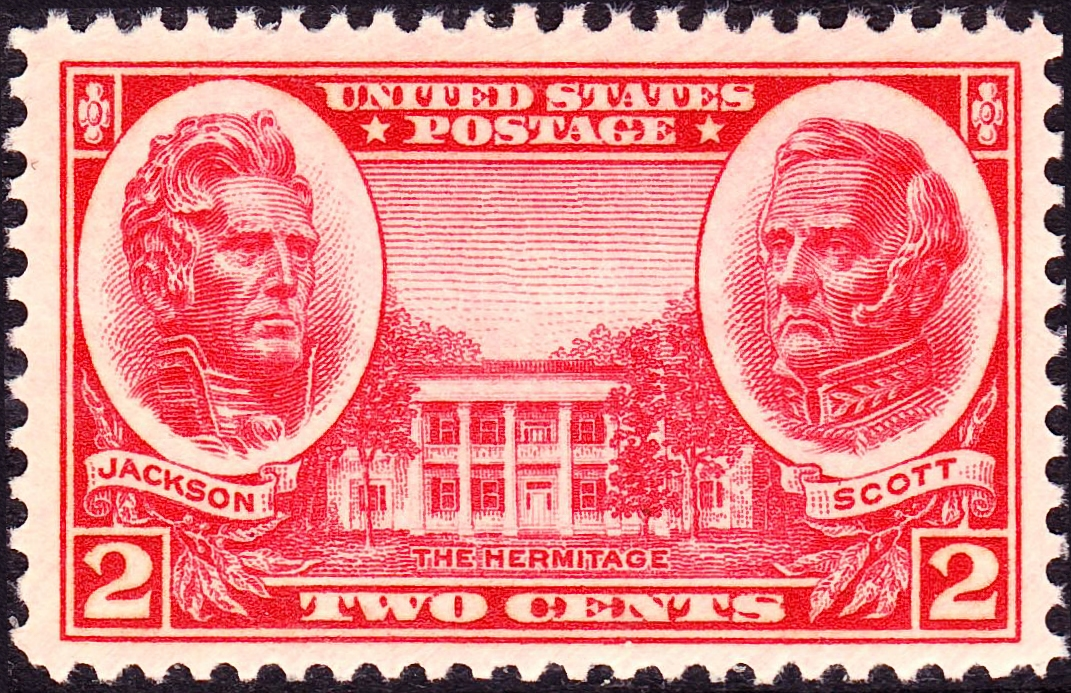
Jackson and Winfield Scott 1964 issue

Winfield Scott was the U.S. hero of the Mexican American War, conquering Mexico City. He recommended Virginia born Zachary Taylor from Kentucky for command of the northern U.S. army. Territory added to the nation was called the Mexican Cession, filling out the U.S. manifest destiny to occupy the North American continent from the Atlantic to the Pacific, from "sea to shining sea".

Pictured alongside Scott in this 1937 issue is the "Hero of New Orleans" from the War of 1812 during James Madison's administration, Andrew Jackson.

=== Civil War ===
The senior commander of the U.S. army at the onset of the American Civil War was Winfield Scott, author of the Anaconda Plan (seen in commemorative above). Union admirals included David Farragut. Union General George Henry Thomas achieved fame in the west as the "Rock of Chickamauga". Opposing were fellow Virginians, Generals Robert E. Lee and Thomas Jonathan Jackson. General J.E.B. Stuart won fame as a cavalry commander.

Lee is portrayed on a single regular issue stamp issued September 21, 1955, at Norfolk, Virginia. Some enthusiasts flew stamps to Alexandria, Virginia, to obtain first day covers from Lee's birthplace. At the time, his birthday was celebrated by many in the South as "Robert E. Lee Day", January 19. The image used for the stamp was inspired by two Library of Congress prints, one for his facial features, the other for Lee's civilian attire, by passing the uniform controversy of the earlier army commemorative. His victories commanding Confederate forces during the American Civil War against superior forces earned him lasting fame and respect. After the war, he urged sectional reconciliation from his post as president of Washington College in Lexington, Virginia, now Washington and Lee University.

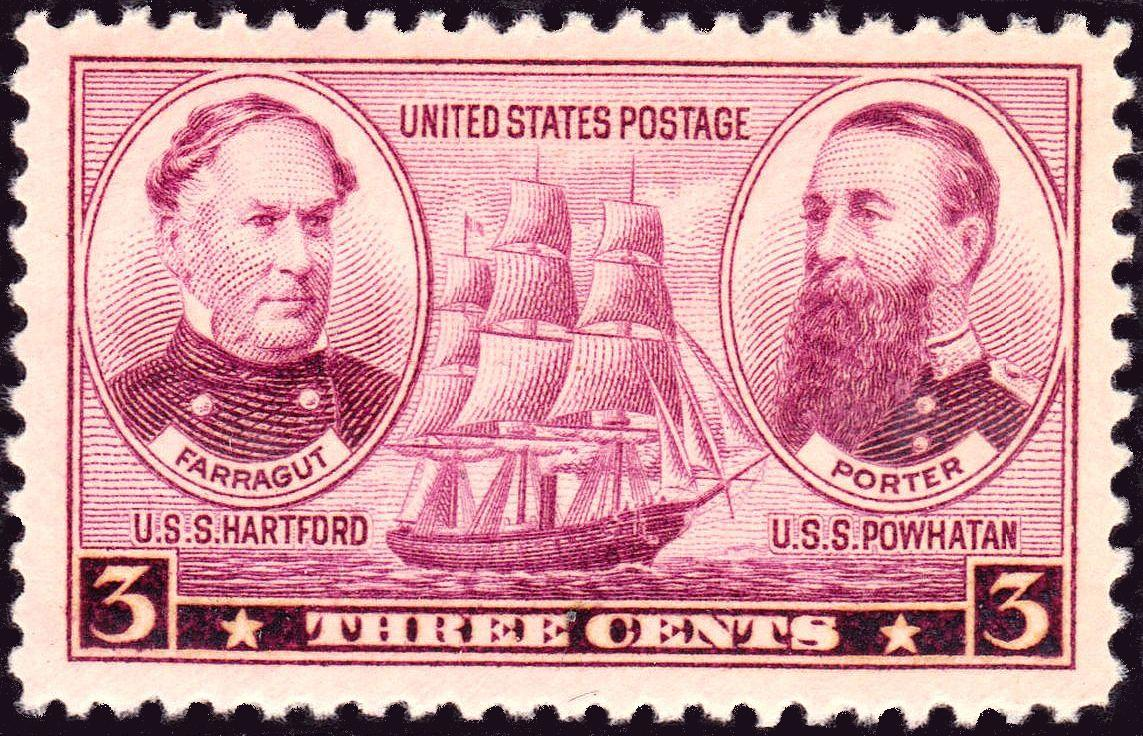
David Farragut and Porter
1965 issue

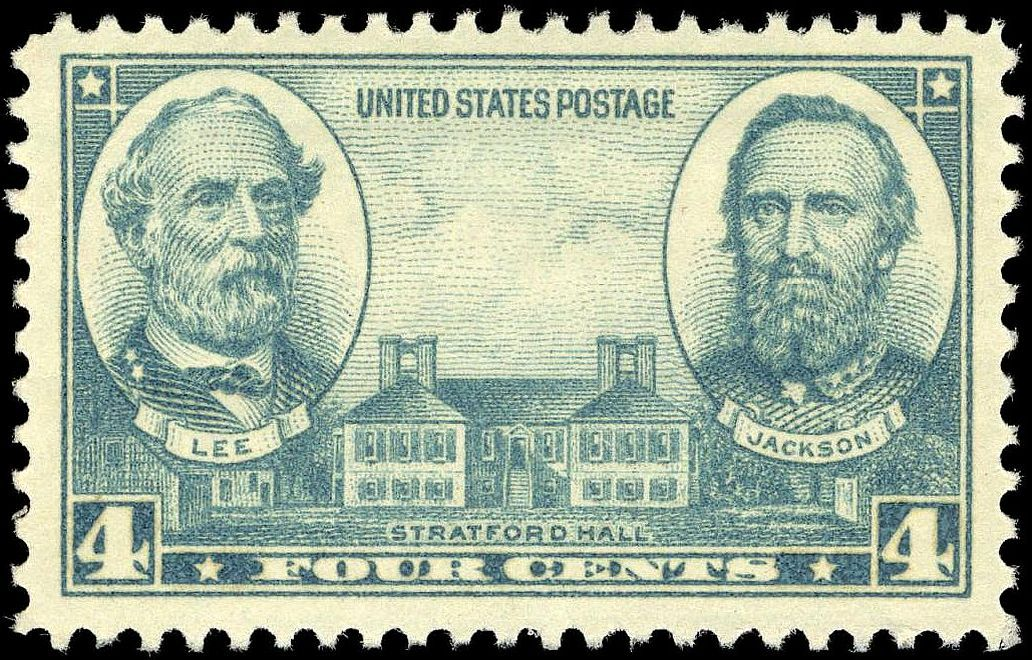
Lee and Jackson
1937 issue

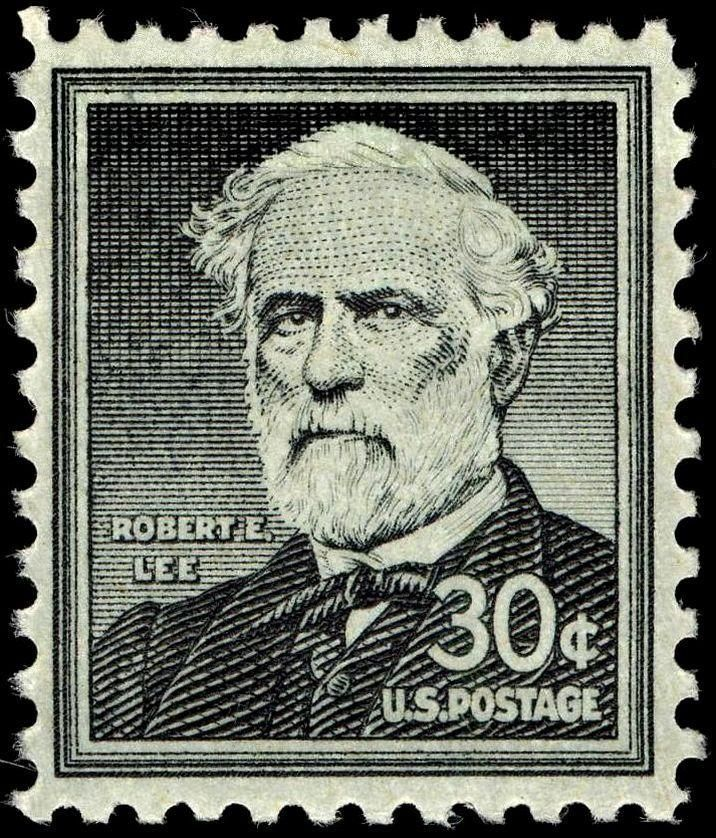
Robert E. Lee
1955 issue

- Robert E. Lee was commemorated with a 32-cent stamp issued in the American Civil War Issue of June 29, 1995. His horse Traveller is pictured in the background. Explanatory text is imprinted on the back of each stamp, issued in a sheet of 20 commemorative Civil War stamps. Stamp Ventures printed the stamps in the gravure process. An image of the stamp is available at Arago online at the link in the footnote.

Virginia was a major battlefield of repeated campaigns between Washington D.C. and the Confederate capital at Richmond, including Battle of First Bull Run in 1861, the 1862 naval ironclad Battle of Hampton Roads, Jackson's Valley Campaign, McClellan's Peninsula Campaign, Battle of Second Bull Run, Battle of Fredericksburg, the 1863 Battle of Chancellorsville, the 1864 Overland Campaign in the Virginia Wilderness and the Siege of Petersburg, and in 1865, "The Surrender" of Lee's army at Appomattox.

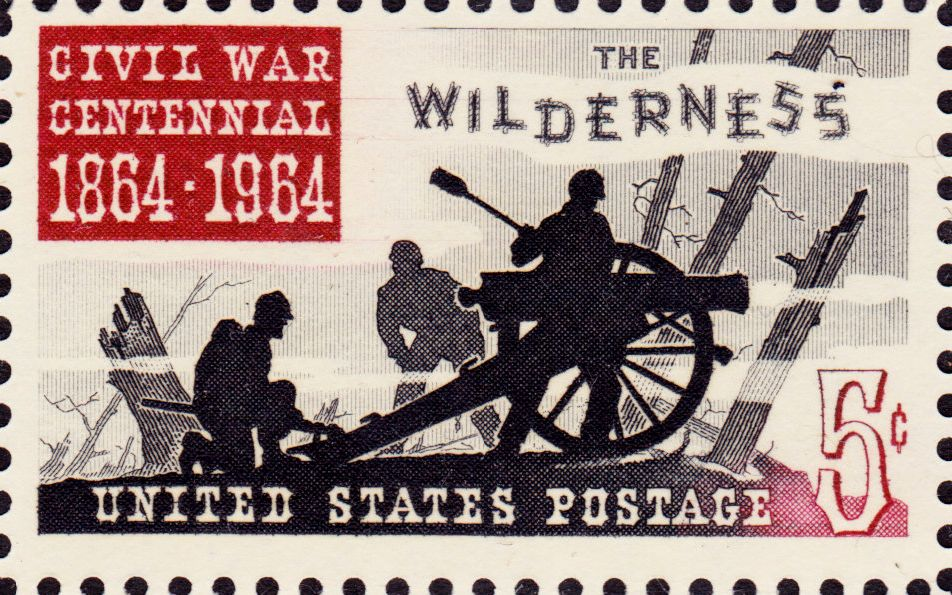
Wilderness campaign
1965 issue

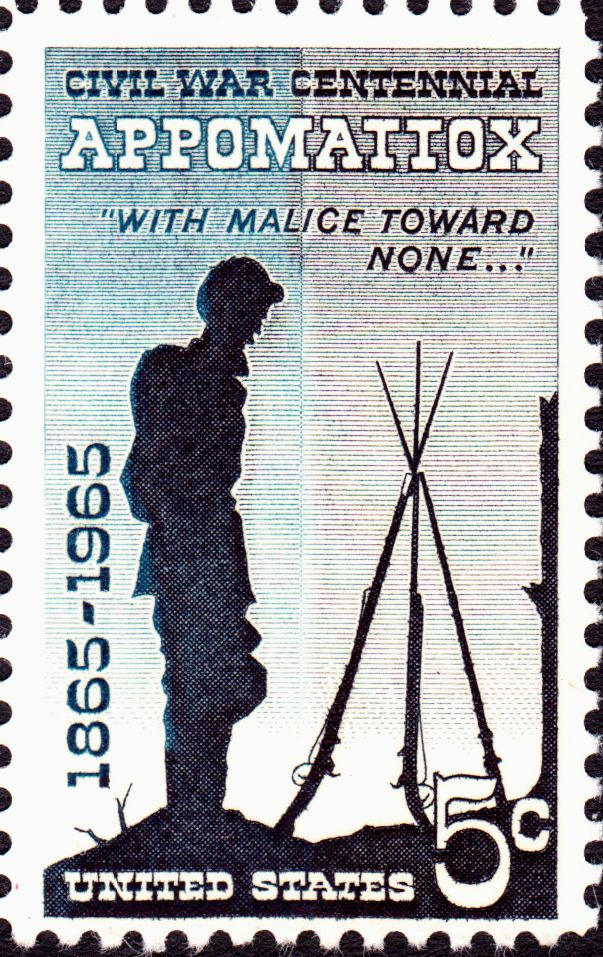
The Surrender
1964 issue

- The Battle of Hampton Roads was commemorated with a 32-cent stamp issued in the American Civil War Issue of June 29, 1995. Explanatory text is imprinted on the back of each stamp, issued in a sheet of 20 commemorative Civil War stamps. Stamp Ventures printed the stamps in the gravure process. An image of the stamp is available at Arago online at the link in the footnote.
- The Battle of Chancellorsville was commemorated with a 32-cent stamp issued in the American Civil War Issue of June 29, 1995. Explanatory text is imprinted on the back of each stamp, issued in a sheet of 20 commemorative Civil War stamps. An image of the stamp is available at Arago online at the link in the footnote.

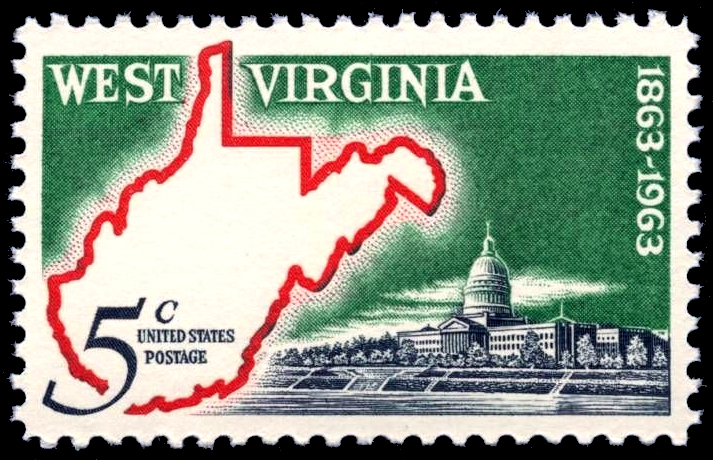
West Virginia statehood 1963 issue

West Virginia became a state following the Wheeling Conventions. Fifty northwestern counties of Virginia whose population had been underrepresented in the General Assembly were successfully admitted to the Union as a new state on June 20, 1863. West Virginia statehood was commemorated on its 100th anniversary with a 5-cent stamp on June 20, 1963. Designed by Dr. Dwight Mutchler of Ohio University, the map's outline is red against a white background. The stamp was printed on the Giori press with a printing of 120 million.

=== World Wars ===
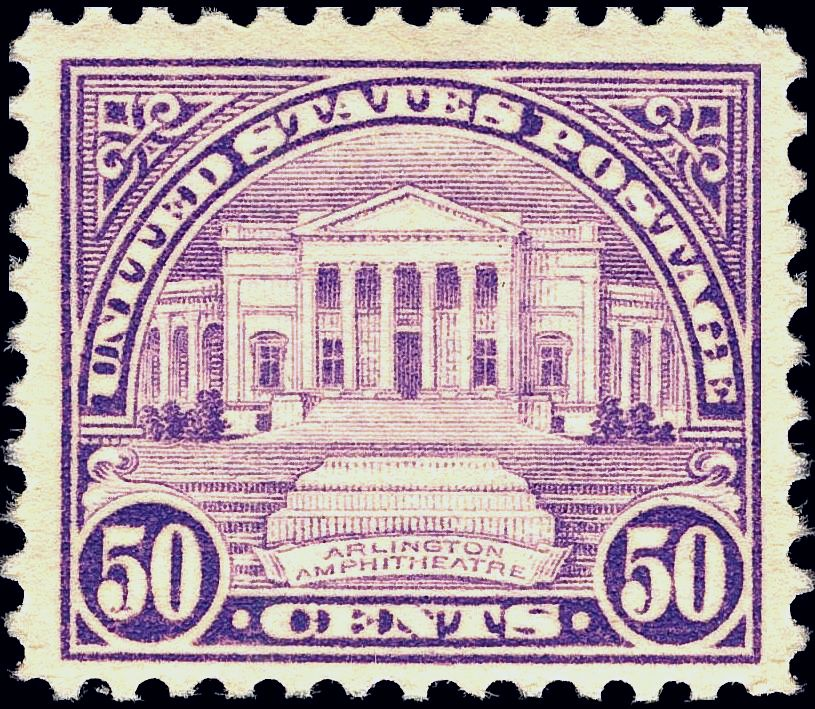
Tomb of the Unknown Arlington, 1938 issue

In World War I, training facilities were set up in Virginia, shipbuilding expanded and the Hampton Roads served as Hampton Roads Port of Embarkation for the United States Army. Virginia-born president Wilson was the war president for World War I. The World War I Tomb of the Unknown Soldier is located at the Arlington National Cemetery in Arlington Virginia. The Arlington Cemetery Amphitheater is commemorated in the Fourth Bureau Issue of the 1920s. The 50-cent was issued on November 11, 1922, the first anniversary of the entombment of the World War I Unknown Soldier on the Armistice day prior. The original tomb is featured in the stamp foreground, based on a photograph and designed by Clair Aubrey Huston. The original simple tomb was covered in 1931 with today's more elaborate sarcophagus.

The Marine Corps War Memorial, also known as the Iwo Jima Memorial, is located in Arlington, Virginia. A replica of the Iwo Jima Memorial in Arlington, Virginia is at the Quantico Base main gate today. The sculpture at the Memorial is by Felix W. de Weldon, then on duty with the U.S. Navy. The same scene is reproduced on a 3-cent stamp on July 11, 1945, a group of Marines raising the U.S. flag over Mount Suribachi during the Battle of Iwo Jima.

- Virginia National Guard Army units made up part of the 29th Infantry Division (United States) which landed on D-day at the Normandy beaches and fought through to Germany in World War II. The USPS commemorated the 50th anniversary of World War II with a miniature sheet of ten 29-cent stamps on June 6, 1994, on the USS Normandy. The 1994 "Road to Victory" was the fourth in a series of five commemorating major events of World War II. One of the two American divisions landing at Normandy were the 29th Infantry Division made up of Virginia National Guard units. The National D-Day Memorial is located in Bedford, Virginia. See the USPS commemorative at D-day June 6, 1944 stamp

=== Recent Virginia ===
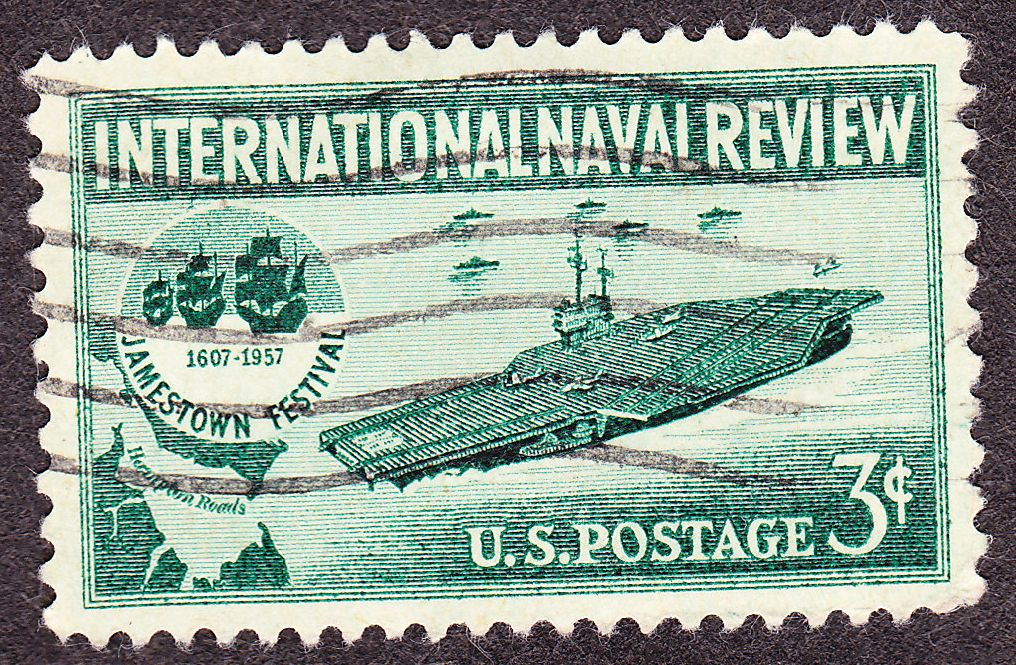
International naval review 1957 issue

Shipbuilding in the Hampton Roads continues to be a major industry. The Norfolk Navy Base is one of the largest in the world.

The International Naval Review and Jamestown Festival was commemorated with a 3-cent stamp on June 10, 1957, in Norfolk, Virginia. The super carrier of the Forrestal class with escort vessels is featured at sea in the Atlantic Ocean approaching a map of the Hampton Roads. On the left is the three sailing ship logo of the Jamestown Festival 1607–1957. Richard A. Genders designed the stamp; 120 million were authorized.

== Other famous Virginians ==
Virginians gained fame in careers away from Virginia and at home, including Texas statesman Sam Houston, Naval officer Hispanic David G. Farragut, educators Booker T. Washington and Carter G. Woodson, poet Edgar Allan Poe, artist Grandma Moses, army doctor Walter Reed, athlete Arthur Ashe, explorers Daniel Boone, Lewis and Clark, and Richard E. Byrd and military leaders George C. Marshall and "Chesty" Puller.

Samuel (Sam) Houston was commemorated on a 5-cent stamp in 1964, just over one hundred years after his death. He is perhaps most famous for defeating Mexican General Santa Ana in 1836 to win Texas independence and then become its president. But he also was the only person to serve as governor of two states, Tennessee and Texas, as well as serving as a U.S. Senator from Texas. The portrait of Houston is based on a lithograph by F. Davingnon.

Admiral David G. Farragut was honored on the 1-dollar stamp of the Second Bureau issue. When Virginia fell into rebellion in 1861, then navy captain Farragut moved his family north to Hastings-on-Hudson NY. In January 1862 he commanded the capture of New Orleans, in July 1863 he forced surrender of Vicksburg and Port Hudson, and in 1864 he won Mobile Bay. Farragut's portrait replaced that of Mathew Perry who was pictured on the 1-dollar First Bureau issue.

Booker T. Washington was the first African-American to be depicted on a U.S. stamp, the 10-cent Famous American Educators issue of April 7, 1940. Born a slave, when Alabama established Tuskegee Negro Normal Institute (Tuskegee University), he became its president. He stressed practical, job-related skills.

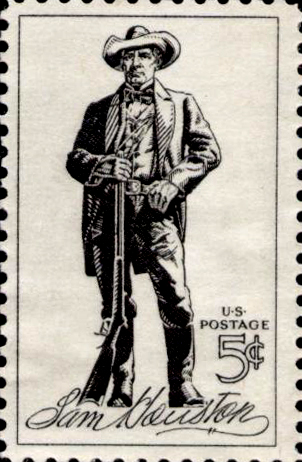
Sam Houston
1963 issue

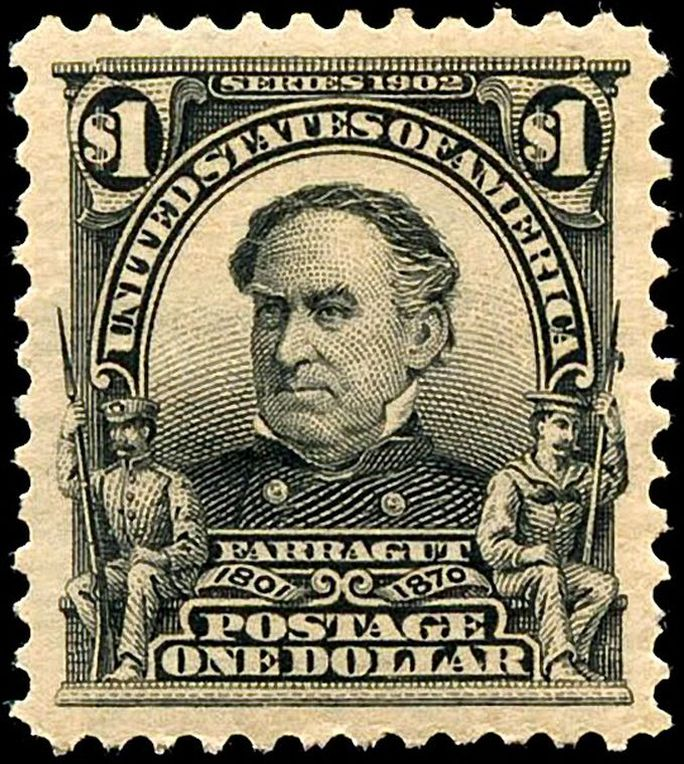
David G. Farragut
1903 issue

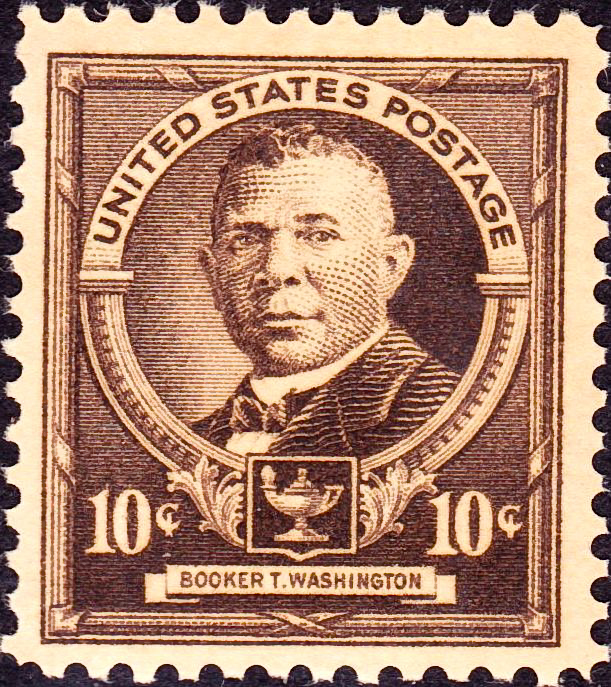
Booker T. Washington
1940 issue

Dr. Walter Reed, a U.S. Army physician, was commemorated on the 5-cent Famous American Scientists stamp issued April 17, 1940. He made a specialty in contagious and infectious diseases, most notably linking flies to the spread of typhoid fever and mosquitoes to the spread of yellow fever.

- Along with Daniel Boone, whose stamp appears above in the Jamestown and settlement section, at least three additional Virginians became famous as explorers and are commemorated on stamps. Virginians Meriwether Lewis and William Clark explored the Purchase Territory and west to the Pacific Ocean on the Lewis and Clark Expedition. Their individual stamp portraits appear above in the Louisiana Purchase section.

Richard E. Byrd's Byrd Antarctic Expedition II was commemorated on a 3-cent stamp the same size and shape as Special Delivery on September 22, 1933. Intended for the collectors' market alone, the 'philatelic mail' with this stamp was carried by the expedition and postmarked at the Little America post office, the expedition's base camp.

The 100th anniversary Edgar Allan Poe's death was honored with a 3-cent stamp issued on October 7, 1949, in Richmond, Virginia. His poems and short stories are masterpieces translated into many languages. His writing has been characterized as "beauty of weird rhythmic poetry", and "neatly conceived and intriguing plots". The stamp reproduces an engraving of Poe by F.T. Stuart from the Library of Congress.

- Edgar Allan Poe's birth was celebrated on its 200th anniversary with a 42-cent stamp on January 16, 2009, in Richmond, Virginia. Poe is recognized as one of America's notable poets and fiction writers. Carl T. Herrman designed the stamp, Avery Dennison (AVR) printed 30 million stamps by the gravure process in pressure-sensitive adhesive panes of twenty stamps.

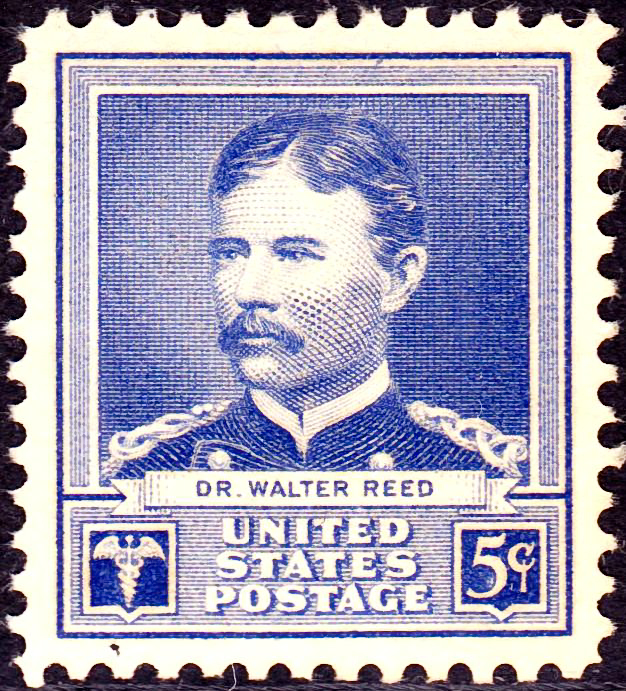
Walter Reed
1940 issue

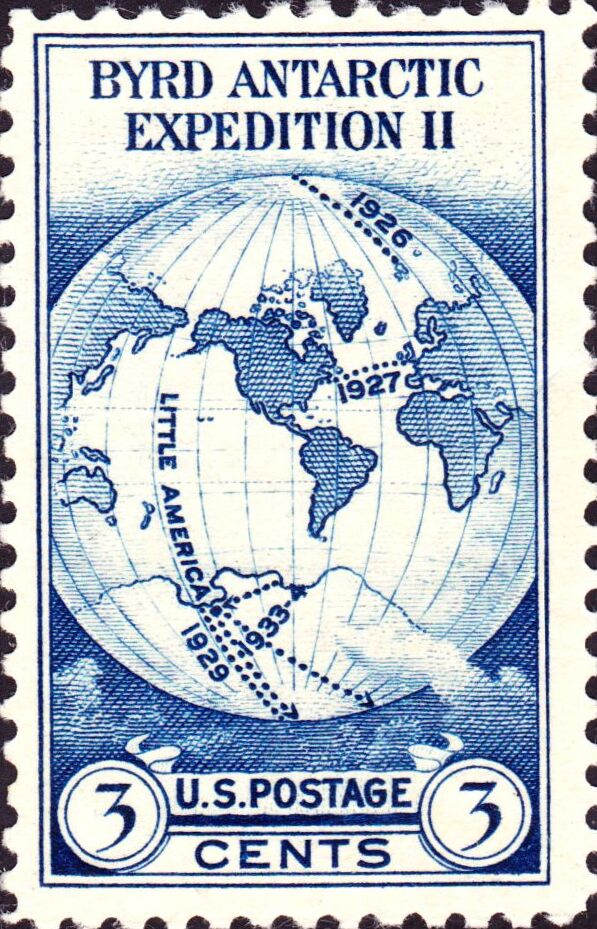
Richard E. Byrd
1933 issue

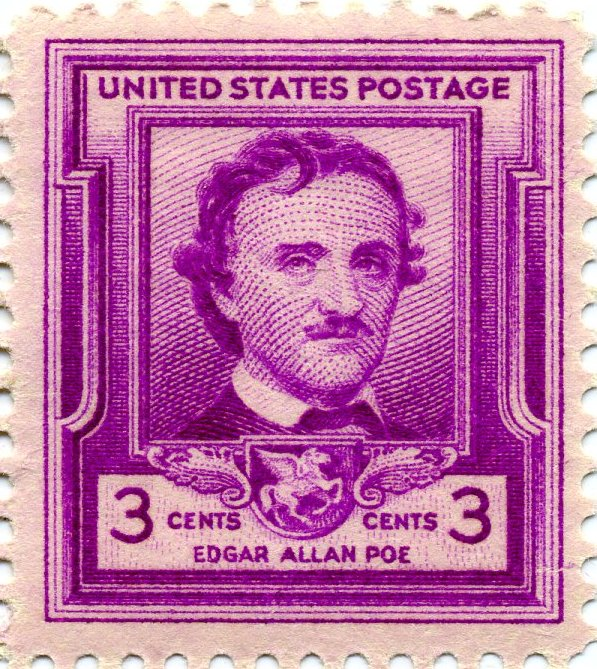
Edgar Allan Poe
1949 issue

George C. Marshall was honored with a 20-cent stamp issued on October 24, 1967, in Lexington, Virginia. A graduate of Virginia Military Institute, he made his home at Dodona Manor in Leesburg, Virginia, now the stewarded by the George C. Marshall International Center. An early advocate of mechanized warfare, during WWII he served Roosevelt as Army Chief of Staff, the first five star "General of the Army". During the Cold War, he served as Truman's secretary of state, overseeing the "Marshall Plan" for which he received the Nobel Peace Prize. He was briefly president of the American Red Cross and Defense Secretary during the Korean War.

Grandma Moses was honored with a 6-cent stamp in 1969 among the American Folklore issue. Born in Greenwich, New York, she retired from Staunton, Virginia farm work in her seventies and began painting. She and her husband spent much of their lives in the Shenandoah Valley. A self-taught artist, discovered in 1939 she produced over 1,500 paintings, including several after her 100th birthday. Her work features rural landscapes with traditional activities evoking simpler times. The stamp is a detail from her "Fourth of July" completed in 1951 when she was 91.

Willa Cather, born near Winchester Virginia, was one of America's most distinguished 20th century novelists. She was honored with a commemorative stamp in 1973. The settings for most of her stories were on the Great Plains of Nebraska and the American Southwest. Her characters including many women, face despair and disillusionment with strength and determination. She won a Pulitzer Prize for her 1922 novel 'One of Ours' about a Nebraskan in World War I.

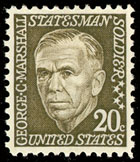
George C. Marshall
1967 issue

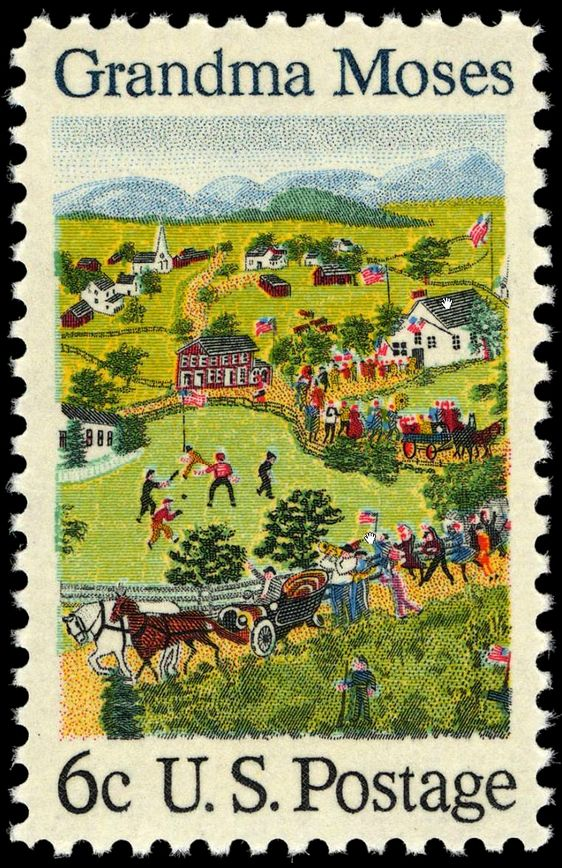
Grandma Moses
1969 issue

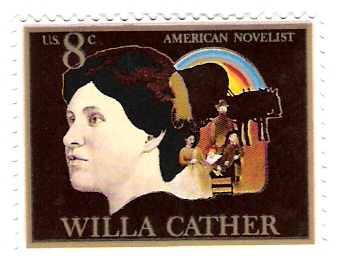
Willa Cather
1973 issue

- Carter G. Woodson was honored with a 20-cent stamp in the Black Heritage Series on February 1, 1984, to coincide with Black History month. He is pictured in the stamp holding a volume of his work in black history, perhaps The Mis-Education of the Negro (1933) which continues to enjoy a wide readership. From 1915 to the end of his life in 1950, Woodson edited the Journal of Negro History, an important venue for black and white scholars writing on matters relating to race at variance with pre-1950s understandings which excluded an appreciation of the contributions African-Americans made to the American past. Black History month grew out of Woodson's initial celebration of Black History Week in 1926, established to widen public awareness of black American's impact on U.S. history. Once seen as mere folklore, he is credited with formalizing the field of academic black history in America as a prominent historian trained at University of Chicago and Harvard University. His academic legacy includes the Association for the Study of Negro Life and History. An image of the stamp is available at Arago online at the link in the footnote.
- Arthur Ashe was honored on a USPS 37-cent stamp on August 27, 2005. The first African-American to win the Grand Slam in tennis, Ashe was known for his intellect, moral character and commitment to social causes. Born in Richmond during the Jim Crow era, he was unable to play on public tennis courts. Not only an exemplary athlete, he spoke out against racism and apartheid. After contracting AIDS from a blood transfusion, he promoted awareness of the disease. The statue in his hometown is on Monument Avenue, a tribute to racial reconciliation. A month before he died, "Sports Illustrated" named him "Sportsman of the Year" and ran this color photograph by Michael O'Neal on the cover of its December 21, 1992 issue. The photo shows a facial portrait of Ashe in glasses holding a tennis racket against a black background. An image of the USPS stamp may be seen at the link to Arago online in the footnote.

Carter G. Woodson
1984 issue

Arthur Ashe
2005 issue

- Chesty Puller (Lewis B. Puller) of West Point, Virginia, was honored on November 10, 2005, as one of four legendary Marines who served with bravery and distinction during the 20th century. The date of issue coincides with the Marine Corps birthday in 1775. The series celebrates a tradition of excellence in military service. An image of the USPS stamp may be seen at the link to Arago online in the footnote.

== Big ideas and landmarks ==
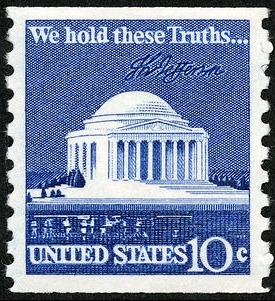
We hold these truths... 1973 issue

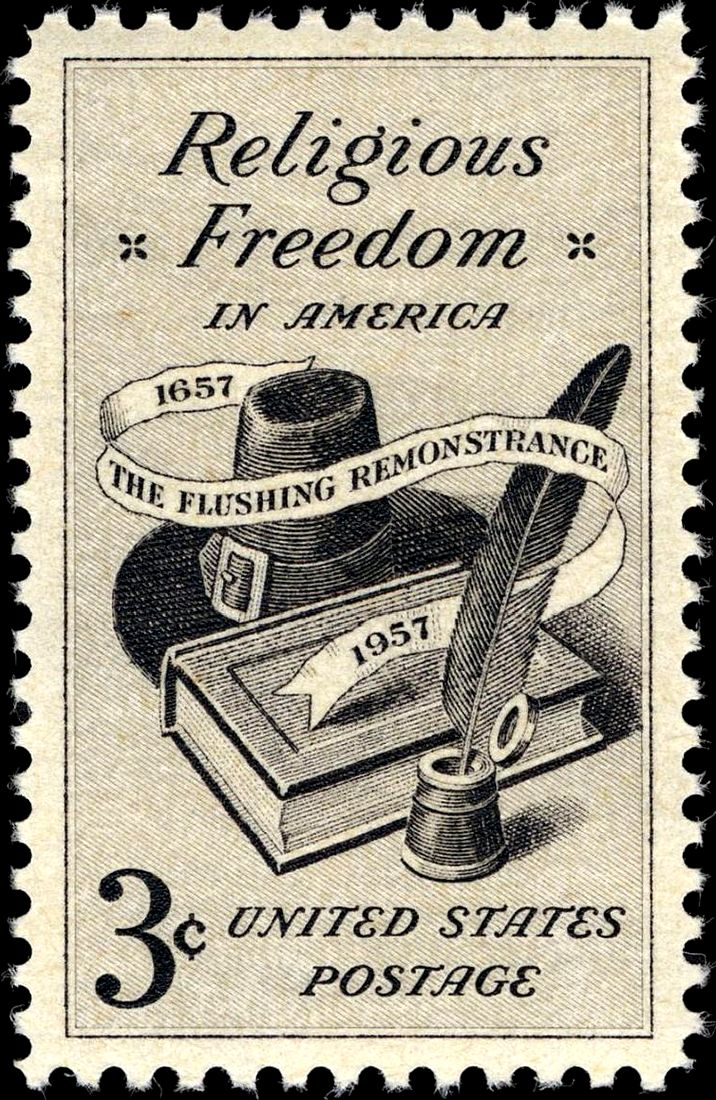
Religious Freedom 1957 issue

The Thomas Jefferson Memorial in Washington, D. C. was commemorated with a 10-cent regular stamp issued on December 14, 1973. The stamp features the introductory phrase to the Declaration of Independence, "We hold these truths..." authored by Jefferson. The neoclassical building was dedicated to the third president of the United States in 1943. It hosts annual Memorial events, Easter Sunrise Services, and the Cherry Blossom Festival. Thomas Jefferson authored the Virginia Statute of Religious Freedom which disestablished the Anglican Church in Virginia. Here religious freedom is commemorated at the earlier Flushing Remonstrance.

Three of the American Credo Series are from quotations by Virginians. Credo is from the Latin for "I believe..." Six heroes of the Republic were chosen, the Virginians were George Washington, Thomas Jefferson and Patrick Henry. The others were Benjamin Franklin, Frances Scott Key and Abraham Lincoln. A poll of 100 distinguished Americans including public leaders, presidents of state universities and historians helped determine the selection.

George Washington's quote is featured on the first 4-cent stamp in the American Credo Series, issued on January 20, 1960, at Mount Vernon, Virginia. The words, "Observe good faith and justice towards all nations." are taken from Washington's presidential Farewell Address of September 17, 1796, The 4-cent rate in the series paid for first class postage.

Thomas Jefferson's quote is featured on the third 4-cent stamp in the American credo series, issued on May 18, 1960, at Monticello, near Charlottesville, Virginia. The words, "I have sworn hostility against every form of tyranny over the mind of man" are taken from his Collected Writings, Vol. 10, Frank P. Conley of New York designed each stamp in the series.

Patrick Henry's quote is featured on the sixth 4-cent stamp in the American Credo series, issued on January 11, 1961, at Richmond, Virginia. The words, "Give me liberty or give me death." are taken from Henry's speech at the Revolutionary Convention at St. John's Church in Richmond on March 23, 1775, Four plates were used to print each stamp in the series.

- "Give me liberty or give me death" -- Patrick Henry.
- "I have sworn ... hostility against every form of tyranny over the mind of man." -- Thomas Jefferson.
- "Observe good faith and justice towards all nations." -- George Washington.

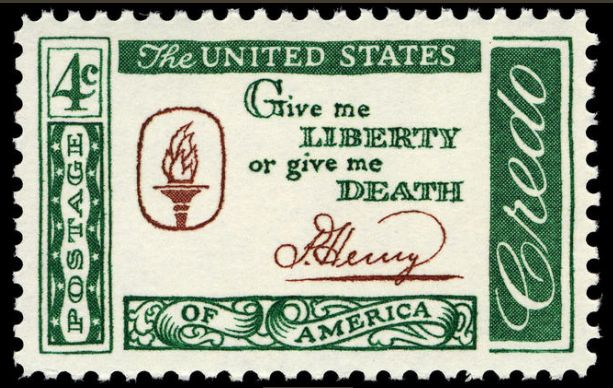
Liberty or death - P. Henry
1960 issue

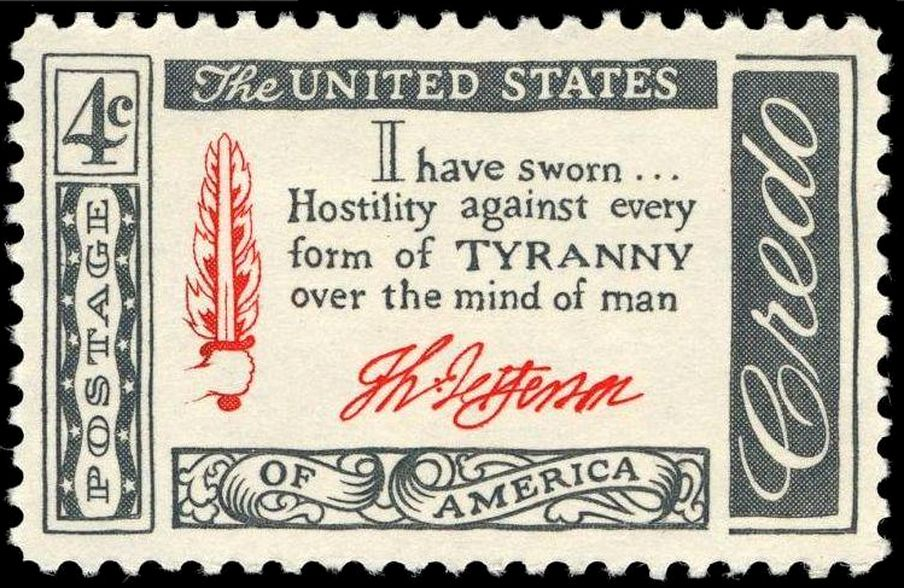
I have sworn hostility -Th. Jefferson
1960 issue

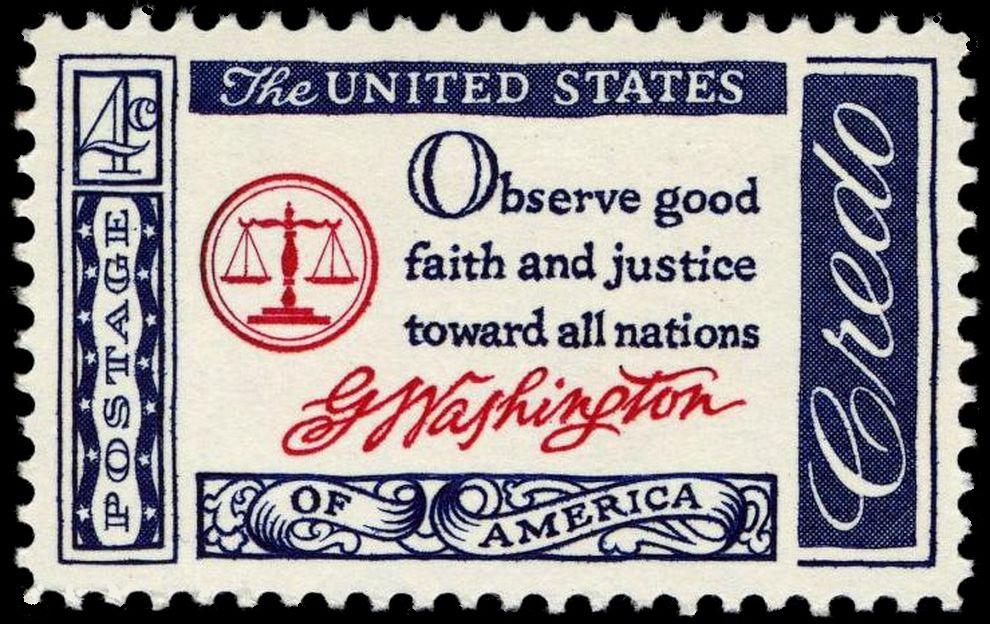
Observe good faith - G. Washington
1960 issue

Virginia landmarks in Northern Virginia commemorated on stamps include Mount Vernon, home of George Washington and his neighbor George Mason at Gunston Hall.

Mount Vernon, George Washington's home, was the background vignette for the 1-cent Army commemorative stamp issued December 15, 1936. The home is flanked by portraits of Washington and Nathanael Greene.

Mount Vernon is the first of the shrines in the Liberty Series, a 1-1/2-cent stamp issued at Mount Vernon, Alexandria Virginia, on February 22, 1956. The vignette shows the east, "River Front" of the building, designed by William K. Shrage of the Bureau of Engraving and Printing, from a photograph. Washington inherited the place on his brother's death; Lawrence had named it for his commander in the British Navy, Admiral Edward Vernon.

Gunston Hall, home of George Mason, was commemorated on June 12, 1958, by a 3-cent stamp. The vignette shows the east, riverfront side of the classic mid-Georgian brick home built by William Buckland in 1758. Mason authored the "Fairfax Resolves" of Virginia's first Constitution, and the Virginia Declaration of Rights, symbolized on the stamp by crossed quill pens.

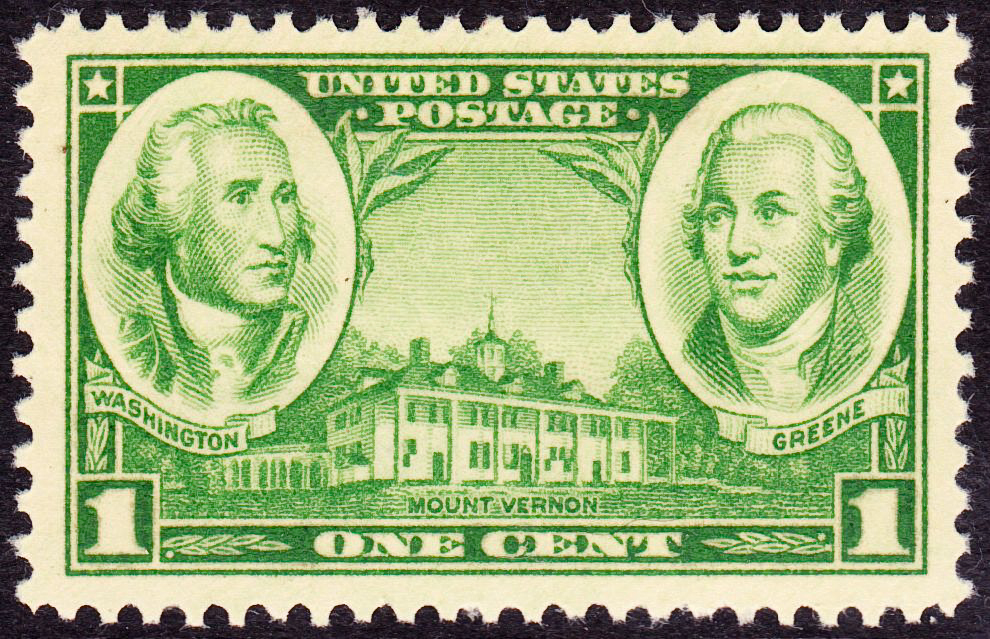
Mount Vernon
1936 issue

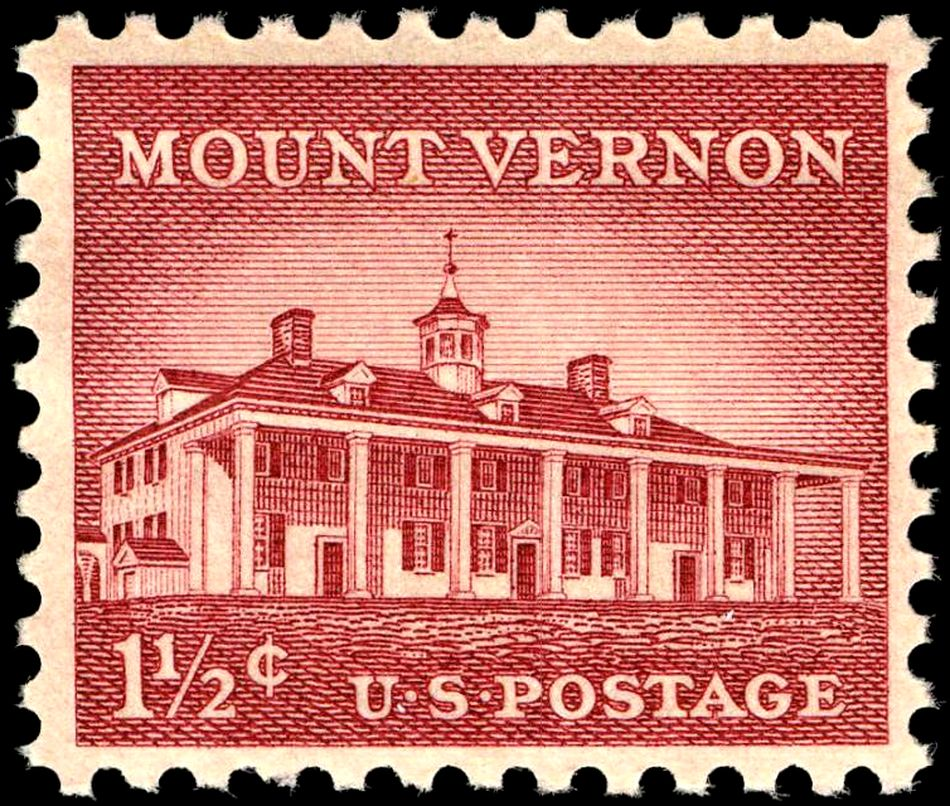
Mt. Vernon
1956 issue

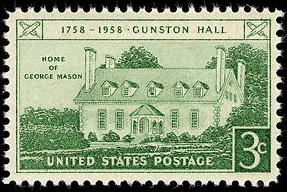
Gunston Hall
1958 issue

Stratford Hall in the Northern Neck, Monticello outside Charlottesville, Carlyle House and Gadsby's Tavern in Alexandria have been featured.

Stratford Hall, Robert E. Lee's ancestral home, was the background vignette for the 4-cent Army commemorative stamp issued March 23, 1937. The home is flanked by portraits of Lee and Stonewall Jackson.

Monticello was one of the three shrines featured in the Liberty Series (1954–1968), appearing on a 20-cent stamp designed by William K. Shrage. This was issued at Monticello near Charlottesville, Virginia on April 13, 1956, Jefferson's 212th birthday. The vignette shows the west, "Garden Front" of Jefferson's home.

The Alexandria bi-centintennial was celebrated on May 11, 1949, with a 6-cent airmail stamp featuring both Old Town colonial "Carlyle House" and "Gadsby's Tavern".

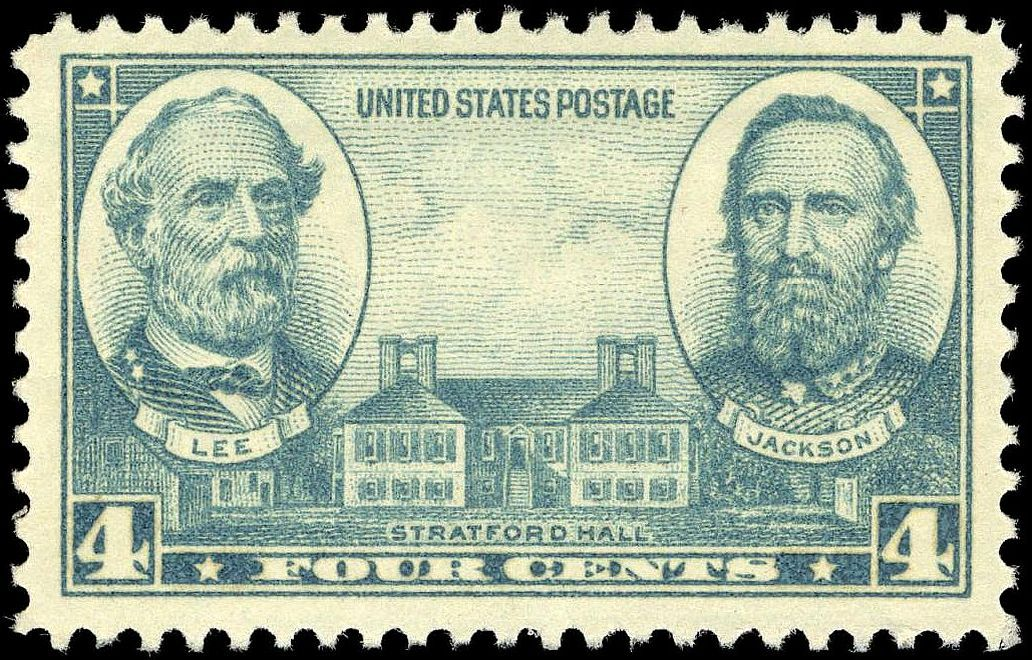
Stratford Hall
1936 issue

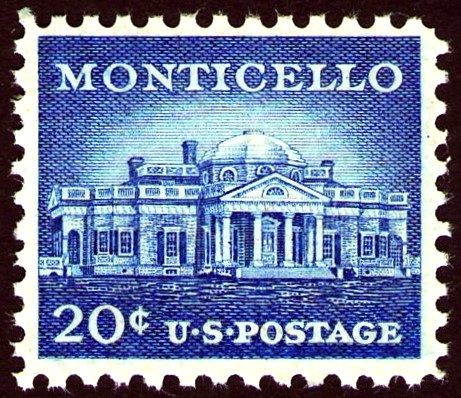
Monticello
1956 issue

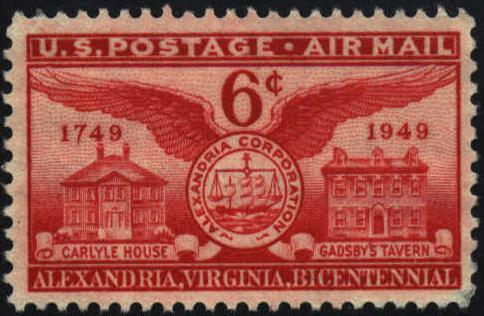
Alexandria old town
1949 issue

The Old Court House in Williamsburg is shown above in the New Nation section commemorating the Ratification of the Constitution in Virginia.

Washington and Lee University founded in 1749 was commemorated on its 200th anniversary with a 3-cent stamp on April 12, 1949. The central design is a view of the university, flanked by portraits of Washington and Lee. Washington's was specially made for this issue. Lee's was a copy of that used in the 3-cent Army issue of 1936–37, but facing left, and without any rank showing on the collar.

Wolf Trap Farm was commemorated with a 6-cent stamp on June 26, 1972. The Wolf Trap Farm Park is now the National Park for the Performing Arts in Vienna, Virginia. As early as 1632 wolves caused much damage in the region, so settlers offered rewards of tobacco for trapped wolves. An official 1739 land survey referred to the area as "Wolf Trap". Mrs. Catherine Filene Shouse had used the place as a retreat since 1930 when she donated the property to the National Park Service. The outdoor venue featured on the 1972 stamp was destroyed by fire in 1982.

- The Civilian Conservation Corps was commemorated with a 20-cent USPS stamp issued on April 5, 1983, in Luray, Virginia. The stamp portrays construction of a typical stretch along the Appalachian Trail. The First Day of Issue ceremony was held at Big Meadows, Virginia, the site of Camp Fechner; Camp Roosevelt near Edinburg, Virginia, was the site of the first CCC camp. President Franklin D. Roosevelt created the CCC on April 5, 1933, appointing Robert Fechner as its national director. The CCCs mission was to employ thousands of young men to develop and conserve the nation's natural resources during the Great Depression. They built roads, irrigation dams, fire towers, camp grounds and trails, planting nearly 1.3 billion trees and stocking streams and lakes with fish and game. An image of the stamp can be found at Arago online at the link in the footnote.

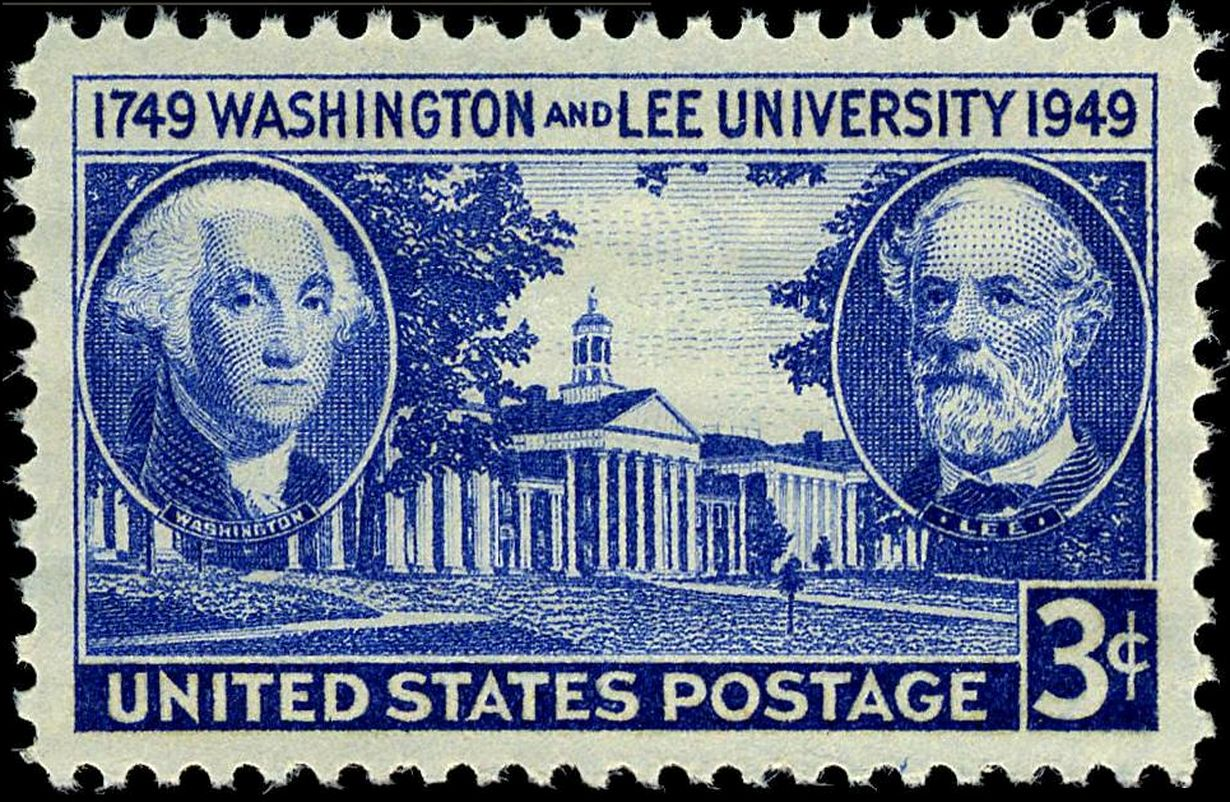
Washington and Lee University
1948 issue

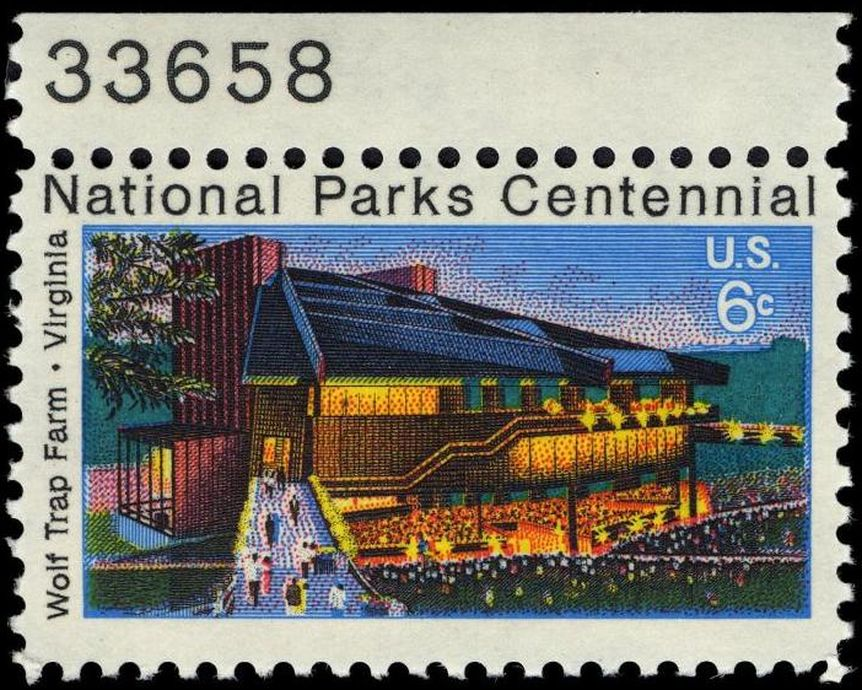
Wolf Trap Farm
1972 issue

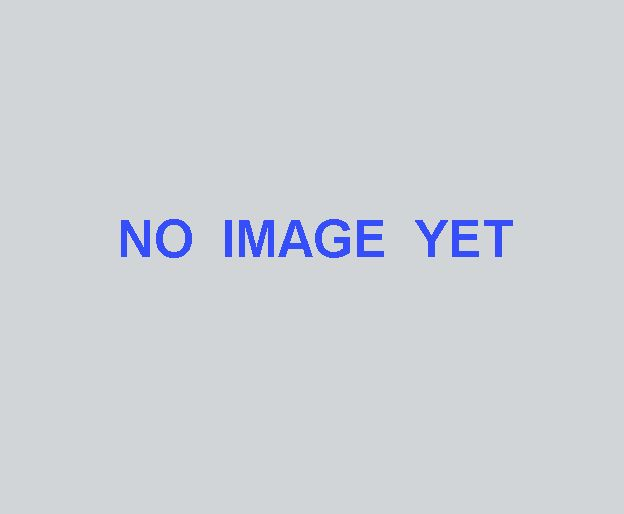
Appalachian Trail
1983 issue - see footnote link

- The Virginia colonial capitol building at Williamsburg is pictured in the 1988 USPS stamp commemorating the bicentennial of the ratification of the Constitution. An image of the USPS stamp may be seen at the link to Arago online in the footnote.
- Montpelier, James Madison's home is featured in the background of the commemorative issued October 18, 2001, in his honor. The date marked the 250th anniversary of his birth in Virginia. An image of the USPS stamp may be seen at the link to Arago online in the footnote.
- The Rotunda (University of Virginia) was commemorated on a 15-cent American Architecture series stamp on June 4, 1979. It was one of a block of four examples of early American architecture including the Baltimore Cathedral, the Boston State House and the Philadelphia Exchange. Each was chosen to represent architecture of beauty, strength and usefulness. An image of the stamp can be found at Arago online at the link in the footnote.
- Washington Dulles International Airport in Dulles, Loudoun County, Virginia, was commemorated on a 20-cent American Architecture series stamp on September 30, 1982. Dulles Airport's Main Terminal was designed by Eero Saarinen. It was one of a block of four examples of modern architecture, including Fallingwater by Frank Lloyd Wright, the Illinois Institute of Technology by Ludwig Mies van der Rohe, and Gropius House by Walter Gropius. Stamps in the series honored the architects who designed great representative structures of design. An image of the stamp can be found at Arago online at the link in the footnote.
- Old Cape Henry Lighthouse was commemorated in the 37-cent Southeastern Lighthouses issue on June 13, 2003, one of five typifying the beauty and history of U.S. lighthouses. The Cape Henry Light was built in 1792, the first constructed by the U.S. government, protecting the southern mouth of the Chesapeake Bay.

== Virginia's presidents ==
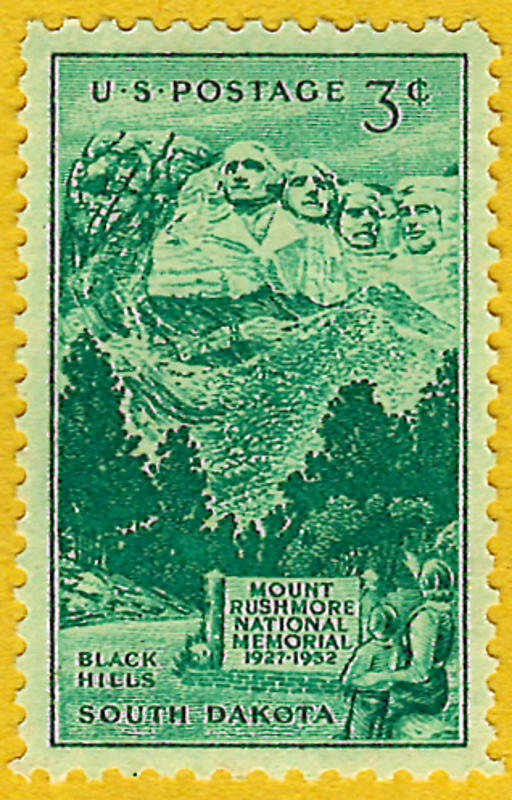
Washington, Jefferson Mount Rushmore, 1952 issue

Eight U.S. presidents have been born in Virginia. Besides those born and raised and elected from Virginia, presidents born in Virginia made their careers in other states, William Henry Harrison in Indiana, Zachary Taylor in Louisiana and in the army, Woodrow Wilson in New Jersey.

Sam Houston made his home in Texas where he became president of the Republic of Texas. Joseph Jenkins Roberts was the first president of the Republic of Liberia.

Virginian presidents Washington and Jefferson are memorialized on Mount Rushmore in the Black Hills of South Dakota. The tribute by Gutzon Borglum was commemorated on the 25th anniversary of the massive sculpture on August 11, 1952. A photograph and postcard served as the model of the design, the 3-cent paid the one-ounce domestic letter rate.

- Five Virginian presidents, Washington, Jefferson, Madison, Monroe and William Henry Harrison are depicted among the 22-cent commemoratives honoring the first nine presidents on the initial sheet of the "Ameripex '86 Issue", released on May 22, 1986, at the international philatelic show in Rosemont, Illinois. An image of the souvenir miniature stamp sheet can be seen at the link in the footnote.

George Washington

George Washington was featured on the 1847 10-cent issue, one of the two stamps that marked the beginning of U.S. philately (the other was a 5-cent Franklin stamp). These were printed by Rawdon, Wright, Hatch and Edson, a New York city banknote engraver and printer. For the 10-cent, there is little to distinguish among the first through the fourth deliveries. There were just over 1 million 10-cent stamps printed, versus 4.4 million 5-cent stamps. The 1847 issue was demonetized on July 1, 1851, probably due to lack of control over the printing media.

George Washington was the central motif of the Confederate 20-cent issue of June 1, 1863. There were over 2 million stamps printed. Color varied from green to deep green, milky green, bluish green and yellow green. First printing is identified with "Archer & Daly, Richmond, Va". The 20-cent paid the double-letter rate, pairs paid the Trans-Mississippi rate, and bisects paid the 10-cent letter rate.

George Washington appeared on the 12-cent stamp in the 1861 issue by the National Bank Note Company. William Marshall engraved one of Gilbert Stuart's portraits of Washington. Two twelve-cent stamps paid postage to England, one 12-cent sufficed after 1868. Over 7 million of the stamps were printed. (In the 1861 issue, Washington was also portrayed on four additional denominations: 3-cents, 10-cents, 24-cents and 90-cents.)

George Washington was featured on the 6-cent 1869 Pictorial issue. Of the first twenty stamps issued in the United States, eleven designs depicted Washington in the role of army commander, presiding officer at the Constitutional Convention, or first president of the United States. The 6-cent image was inspired by a portrait by Gilbert Stuart, similar to that of the 10-cent 1847 issue. The stamp paid double-weight, first-class domestic postage. Over 4.8 million were printed. On all subsequent definitive issues released between 1870 and 1932, Washington's was the sole image to appear on the stamp covering the normal letter rate (2-cents or 3-cents).

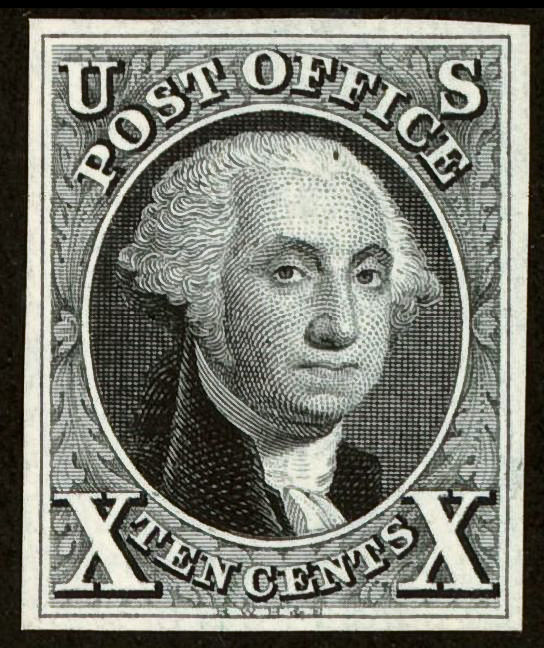
George Washington
1847 issue

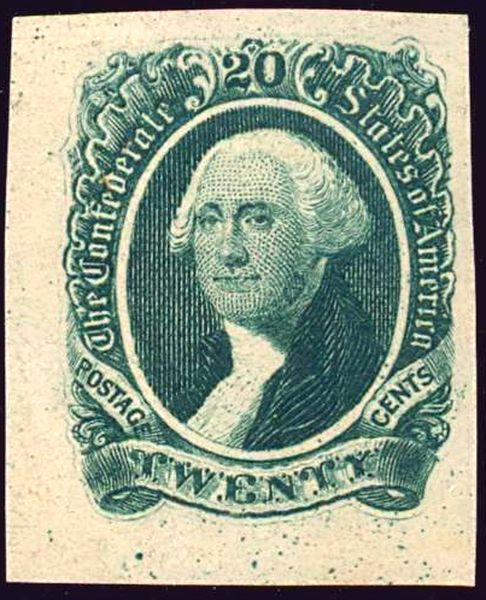
George Washington
CSA 1861 issue

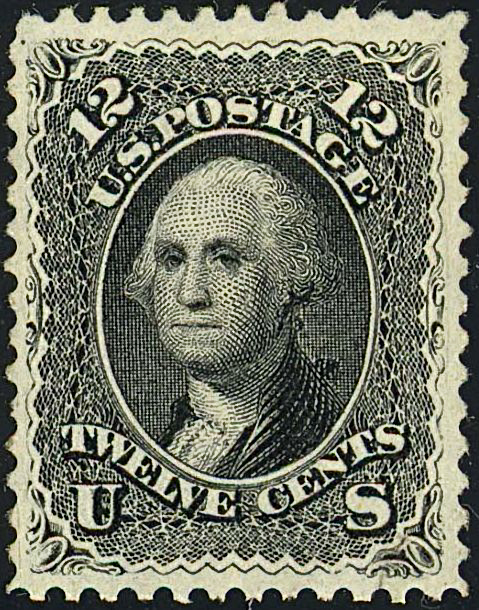
George Washington
1861 USA issue

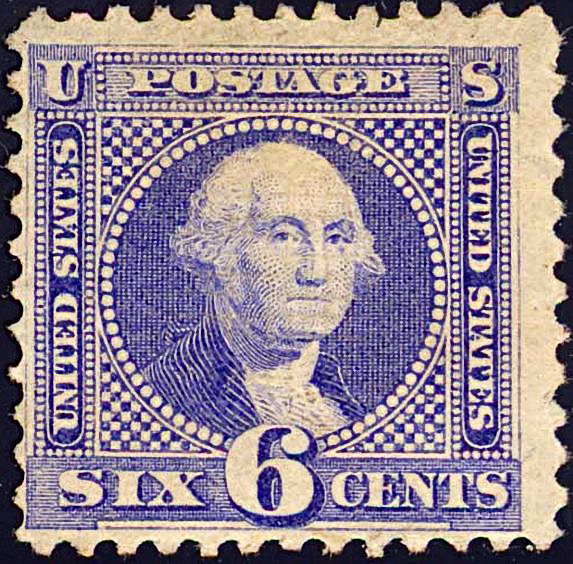
George Washington
1869 issue

George Washington was depicted in identical images on twelve of the thirteen stamps comprising the original Third Bureau series, issued in 1908–09 (the remaining stamp, the 1-cent value, featured Franklin). In a modified version of the series, introduced 1912–14, Washington appeared only on the seven denominations between 1-cent and 7-cents. Many of these stamps exist in multiple variants: the 5-cent value shown here, first issued in December, 1908, eventually ran in seventeen versions, differentiated by papers, coils, watermarks and perforations. The 5-cent paid the Universal Postal Union international rate. Over 2.6 billion of the stamp were issued. (See also: Washington-Franklin Issues.)

George Washington appears on the 1-cent 1938 Presidential Series stamp, the first president of the United States. Washington, the "Father of his country", Washington has been pictured on more U.S. stamps than any other individual. The stamp was printed in the millions, available in sheet stamp, horizontal and vertical coil, and as a booklet pane. The one-cent paid for domestic post card rate, or one-ounce local drop rate.

George Washington was honored on the 1-cent Liberty Issue 1954–1968 on August 26, 1954. Charles R. Chickering prepared an original drawing from a photograph taken at the National Gallery. The original portrait was by Gilbert Stuart, painted from life in 1795. The fully perforated stamp was issued at Chicago, Illinois; the first first-day ceremony for a coil stamp took place on October 8, 1954, at Baltimore, Maryland.

George Washington is featured on the 5-cent issue of February 22, 1966, in Cincinnati, Ohio. Washington was eulogized by his fellow Virginian Henry Lee, as "first in war, first in peace, first in the hearts of hfs countrymen." Bill Hyde designed the stamp after a painting by Rembrandt Peale at the National Gallery of Art. The 5-cent paid the first-class letter rate. The public objected that the heavy shading around the lower part of the face made Washington look unshaven, and so, a lightened version of the issue appeared in November 1967.

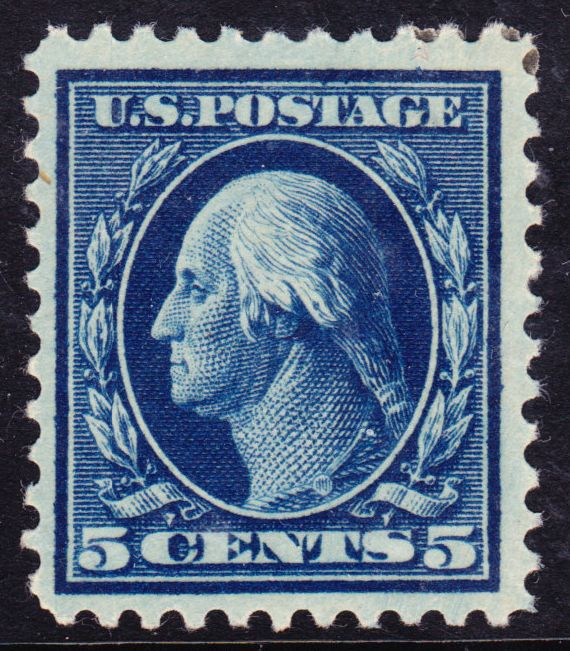
George Washington
1917 issue

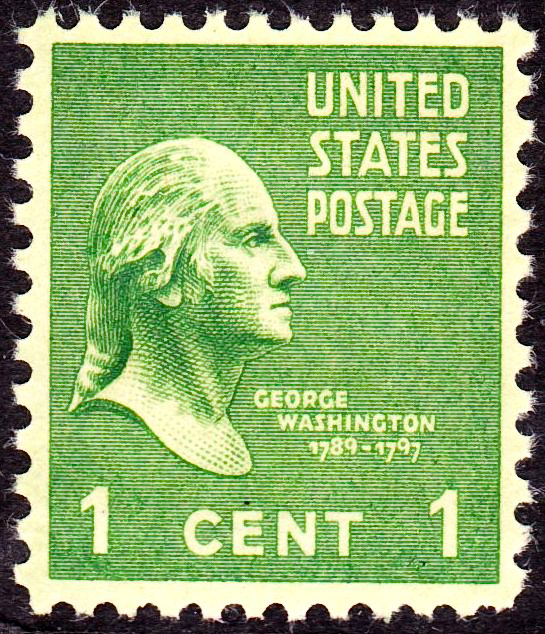
George Washington
1938 issue

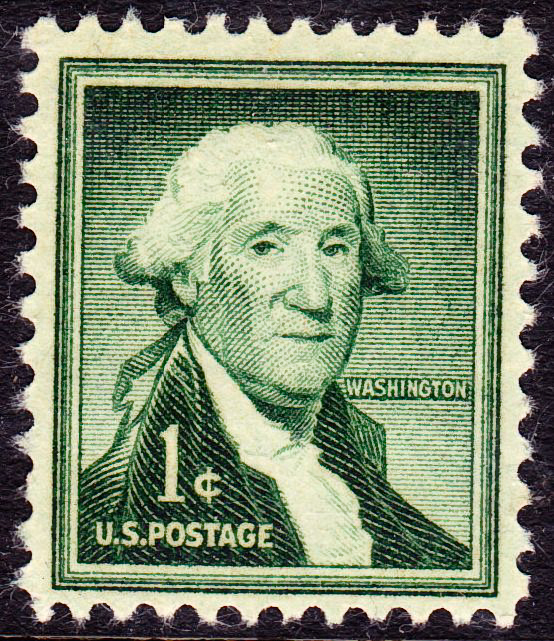
George Washington
1954 issue

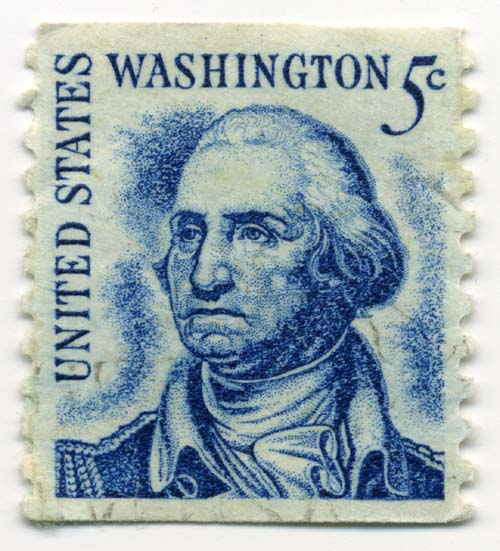
George Washington
1966 issue

Thomas Jefferson

Thomas Jefferson was honored not only in the Union, but in the Confederacy beginning November 8, 1861 on a 10-cent stamp. Designed by Hoyer & Ludwig of Richmond, Virginia, this issue was based on the same portrait that had been replicated on the U.S. 5-cent stamp of 1856. Both Hoyer & Ludwig and J.T. Paterson & Co. of Augusta, Georgia printed this lithographed design. The stamp was typically used for the postage rate after the rate increase to 10¢ on July 1, 1862. The first stone was used for 1,400,000 printings.

Thomas Jefferson is honored on the 50-cent stamp in the Second Bureau Issue, 1902–1908. He is honored more frequently on U.S. stamps than any other than Washington, Franklin and Lincoln. The 50-cent was issued March 23, 1903, designed by R. Ostrander Smith from the 1805 Edgehill Portrait by Gilbert Stuart. Secretary of State during Washington's administration, Jefferson is most renowned in his presidency for doubling the size of the United States with the Louisiana Purchase in 1803. Jefferson had previously appeared in every definitive series released since 1870: the Large Banknote issues (1870–89), the Small Banknote issue (1890) and the First Bureau series (1894).

Thomas Jefferson appears on the 3-cent 1938 Presidential Series stamp, the third president of the United States. Jefferson was one of the most influential founders of the United States, author of the Declaration of Independence. Jefferson's image is taken from a bust at the Congressional Library. The 3-cent was the "workhorse" for first-class domestic postage; 130 billion stamps were printed. The 3-cent rate applied to one-ounce postage for Pan American Union and Spain Treaty rate on letters addressed to South America and Spain.

Thomas Jefferson is honored on the 1-cent stamp in the Prominent Americans Issue of 1965–1978, released on January 12, 1968, in Jeffersonville, Indiana. Robert Geissmann designed the stamp from an 1800 portrait by Rembandt Peale in the White House. Jefferson's successes during his presidency include reducing the national debt and fighting the Barbary Coast pirates.

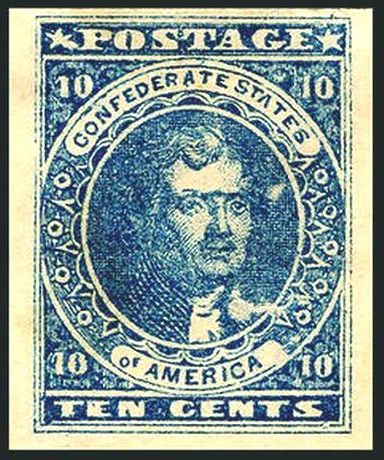
Thomas Jefferson
CSA 1862 issue

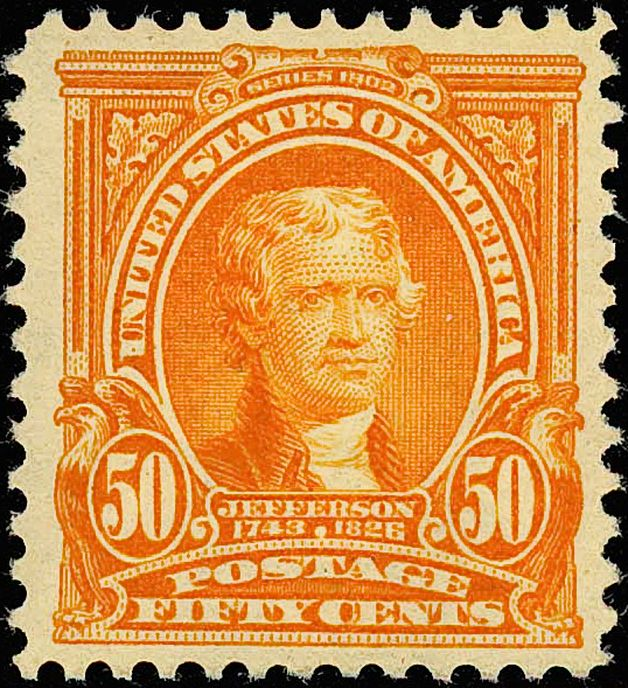
Thomas Jefferson
1903 issue

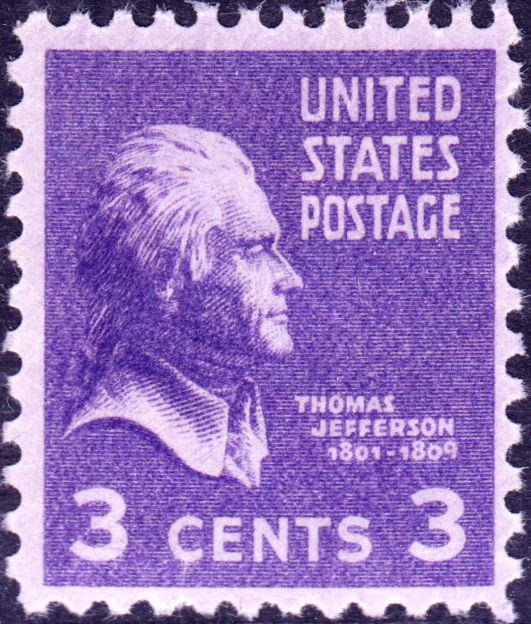
Thomas Jefferson
1938 issue

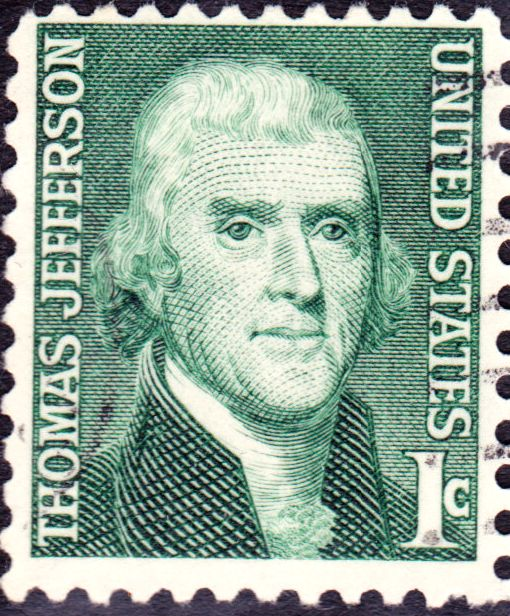
Thomas Jefferson
1968 issue

- Thomas Jefferson's was featured on the 29-cent Great Americans series on April 13, 1993. The USPS stamp may be seen on Arago, National Postal Museum online at the footnote link.

James Madison

James Madison, the fourth U.S. president was honored on the 2-dollar First Bureau Issue stamp of 1894. He was a leader in the colonial Virginia Assembly and participated in framing the Virginia Constitution of 1776. He served in the Continental Congress and in the Constitutional First Congress framed the Bill of Rights. Secretary of State under President Jefferson, his own presidency saw the War of 1812. Madison reappeared on the 2-dollar stamp of the Second Bureau Issue (1902–08), which was designed by R. Ostrander Smith from a painting by an unknown artist. Used for large, foreign letter rate parcels, this stamp was reissued during World War I to meet the demand for postage for machine parts mailed to Russia. The original issue, of which about 31,000 copies were printed, is watermarked and has a distinctive dark blue sub-shade. By contrast, some 305,000 copies were produced of the reissue (1917), which is unwatermarked. Most commonly used for heavy overseas mail (as aforesaid), as well as internal Post Office Department accounting. The designs for the entire 1902 series are available online at the link in the footnote.

James Madison appears on the 4-cent 1938 Presidential Series stamp, the fourth president of the United States. Madison, the "Father of the Constitution" proposed the system of checks and balances in three branches of federal government at the Constitutional Convention. Two varieties of the 4-cent were printed, a sheet stamp and sidewise coil. Not widely used at first, it later met the 4-cent met domestic airmail postcards and domestic first class letter after 1949.

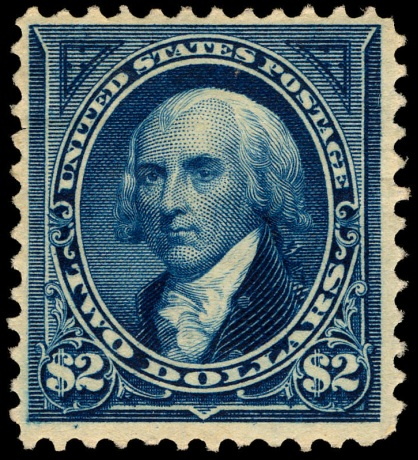
James Madison
1894 issue

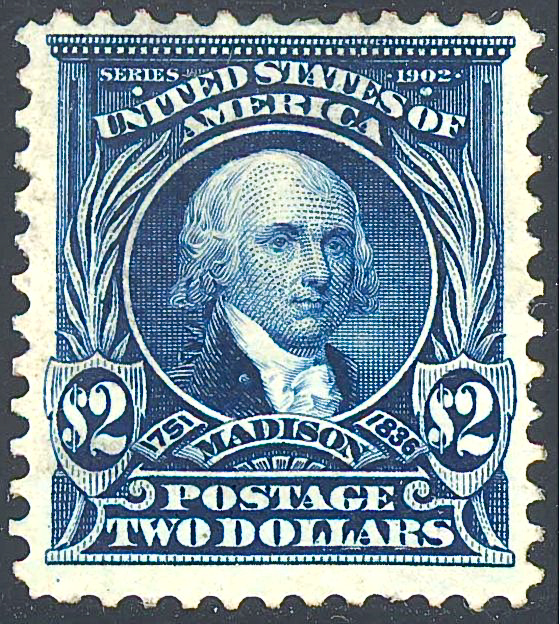
James Madison
1903 issue

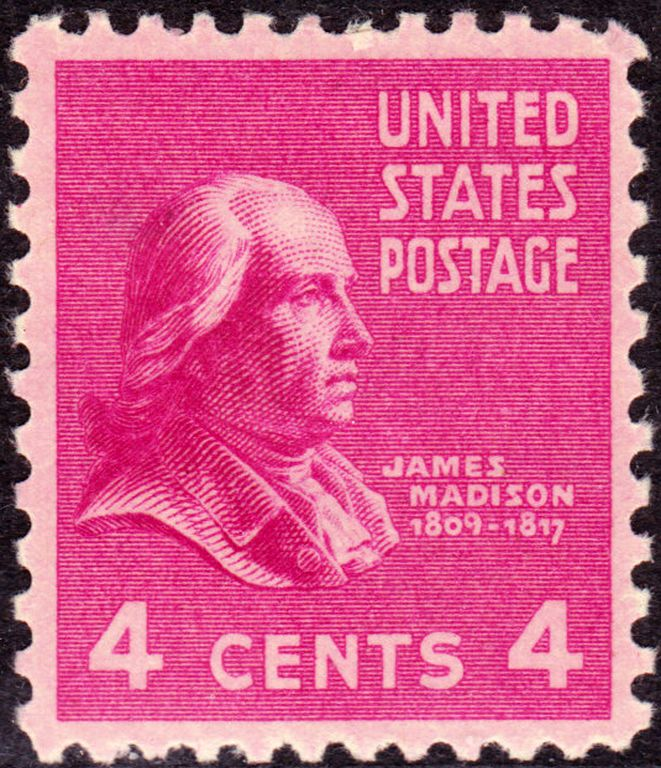
James Madison
1938 issue

- James Madison was honored of the commemorative issued October 18, 2001, the 250th anniversary of his birth. His home at Montpelier, is featured in the background. The "father of the Constitution", Madison played a leading role in creating the Bill of Rights. He was Jefferson's secretary of state before ascending to the presidency himself. The Banknote Corporation of America printed 32 million stamps in the offset/intaglio process in a gummed pane of twenty. An image of the USPS stamp may be seen at the link to Arago online in the footnote.

James Monroe

James Monroe is honored on the 10-cent of the 1923 series, the Fourth Bureau Issue. He served as president of the U.S. from 1817 to 1825. Clair Aubrey Huston designed the Monroe stamp from an engraving by George F.C. Simille for the 1904 Louisiana Purchase Exposition series. The 10-cent paid the registry and special delivery rates.

James Monroe appears on the 5-cent 1938 Presidential Series stamp, the fifth president of the United States. Monroe was a prominent leader in the Revolutionary War, and is known for the "Monroe Doctrine" of his presidency, warning Europeans to stay out of the Americas. Monroe's likeness was taken from a medal from the U.S. Mint. The 5-cent was used for the one-ounce international surface rate and later the one-ounce domestic airmail rate.

James Monroe (1758–1831) appears on the 5-cent Liberty Series stamp issued December 2, 1954 at Fredericksburg, Virginia. The portrait for the stamp design is by Rembrandt Peale, displayed at the James Monroe Law Office and Museum in Fredericksburg, where Monroe practiced law. At the first day ceremony, three hundred carrier pigeons were released to state capitals within a five-hundred mile range, arriving before the regular mails. They were managed by William Pennington, director of their use in the Signal Corps during WWII.

James Monroe was celebrated on his birthday April 28, 1958 on its 200th anniversary with a 3-cent stamp issued at Montross, Virginia. The stamp was designed by Frank P. Conley, taken from a Gilbert Stuart portrait. It was printed with the rotary process with 120 million stamps authorized.

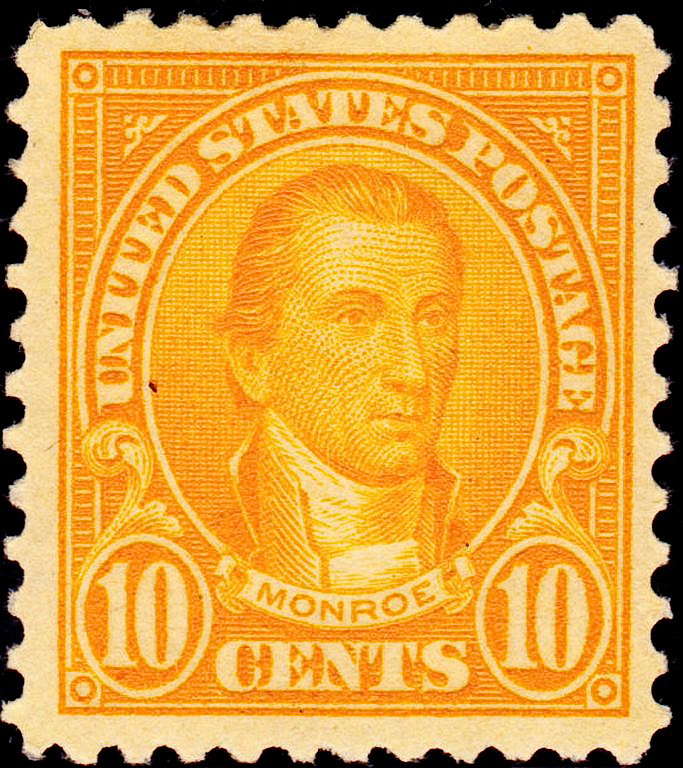
James Monroe
1925 issue

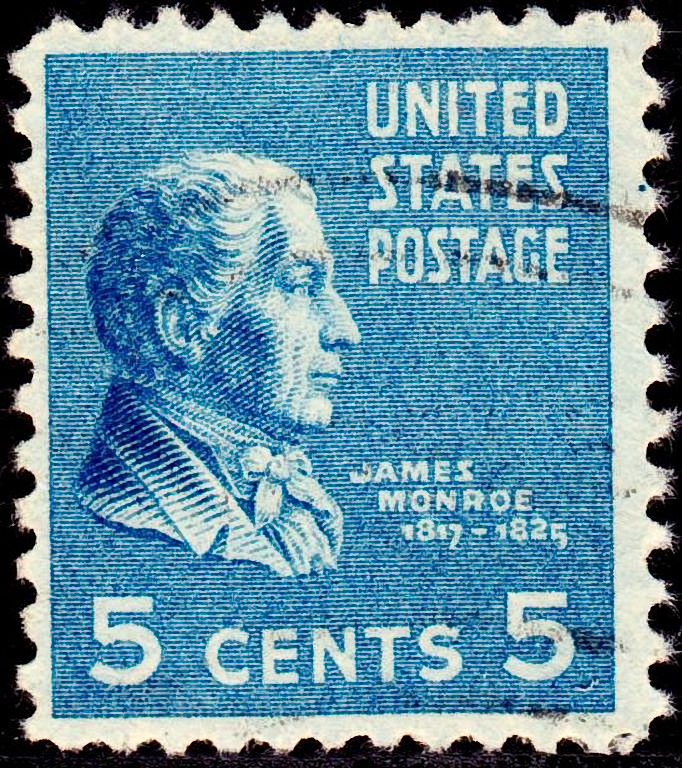
James Monroe
1938 issue

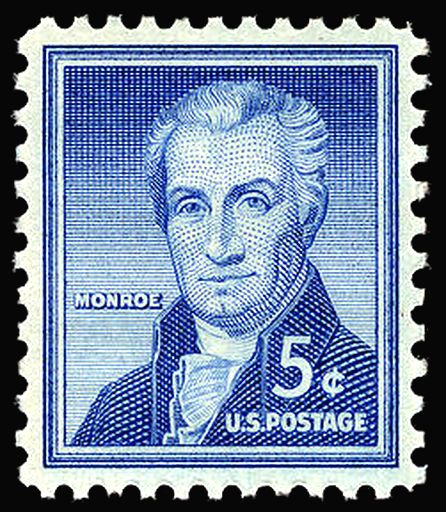
James Monroe
1954 issue

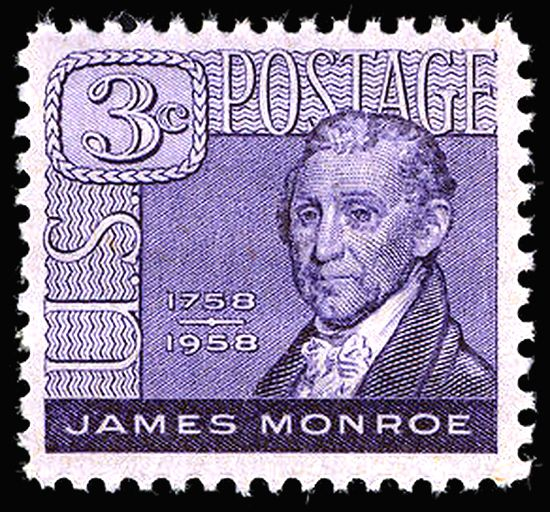
James Monroe
1958 issue

William Henry Harrison

William Henry Harrison is featured on the 150th anniversary of the Indiana Territory (1800) issued July 4, 1950. Harrison was the first governor of Indiana Territory and later the 9th president of the U.S. The stamp was printed by the rotary process in blue, electric eye perforated with 115 million authorized.

William Henry Harrison appears on the 9-cent 1938 Presidential Series stamp, the ninth president of the United States. Harrison was a hero of the Indian Wars and the War of 1812. He was the first president to die in office, thirty days into his term. Harrison's likeness was inspired by a bust in the Rotunda of the Virginia State Capitol. The 9-cent was used to pay for a three-ounce first class postage, or three-ounce Pan-American postage.

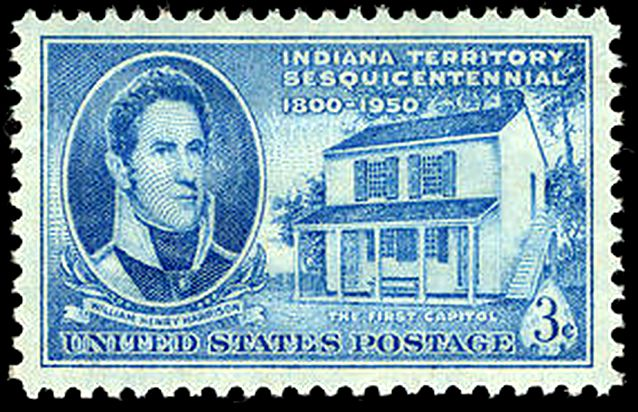
William Henry Harrison
1950 issue

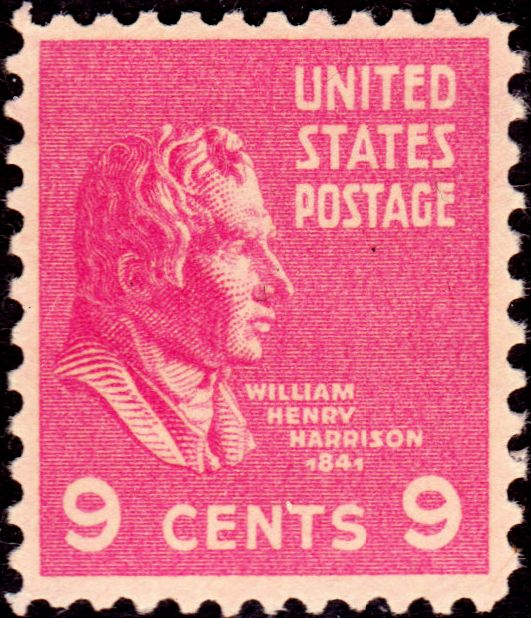
William Henry Harrison
1938 issue

John Tyler and Zachary Taylor

John Tyler appears on the 10-cent 1938 Presidential Series stamp. The tenth president of the United States, Tyler was the first vice president to assume the presidency when William Henry Harrison died thirty days into his term. Tyler finished the term but did not seek re-election. The 10-cent covered the half-ounce rate for Puerto Rico, the Virgin Islands and the Canal Zone.

Zachary Taylor was honored in the 5-cent "Large Bank Note Issues" of 1879–1881, produced by the American Bank Note merger with the Continental Bank Note Company. The ABN attempted to fulfill the stamp contract with minimal expense, using soft porous paper. The 5-cent met the Universal Postal Union international rate.

Zachary Taylor appears on the 12-cent 1938 Presidential Series stamp. The twelfth president of the United States, Taylor was a soldier for over forty years. "Old Rough and Ready" was said to have never lost a battle, and he became a national hero during the Mexican War. He died after sixteen months in the presidency. The 12-cent was used for special delivery for a local letter.

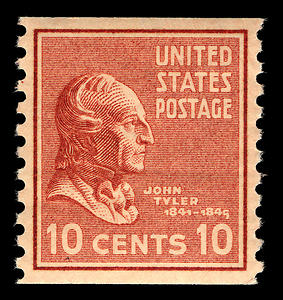
John Tyler
1938 issue

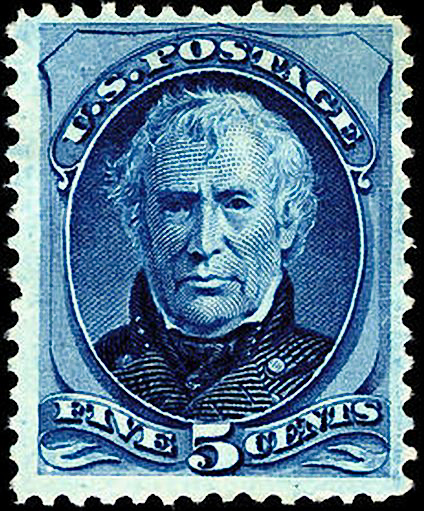
Zachary Taylor
1875 issue

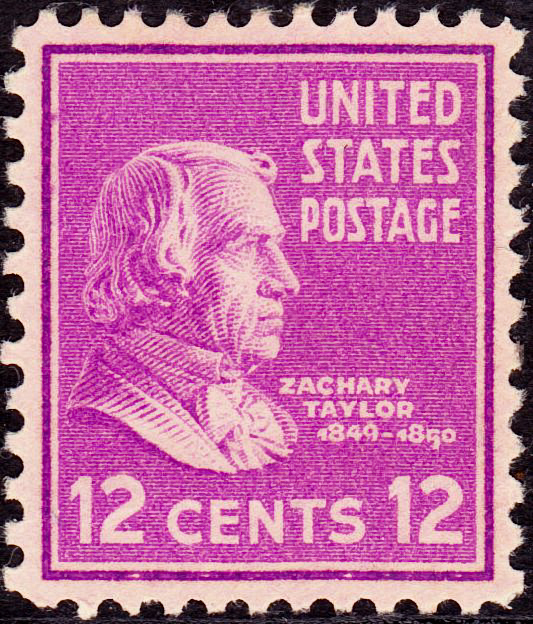
Zachary Taylor
1938 issue

Woodrow Wilson

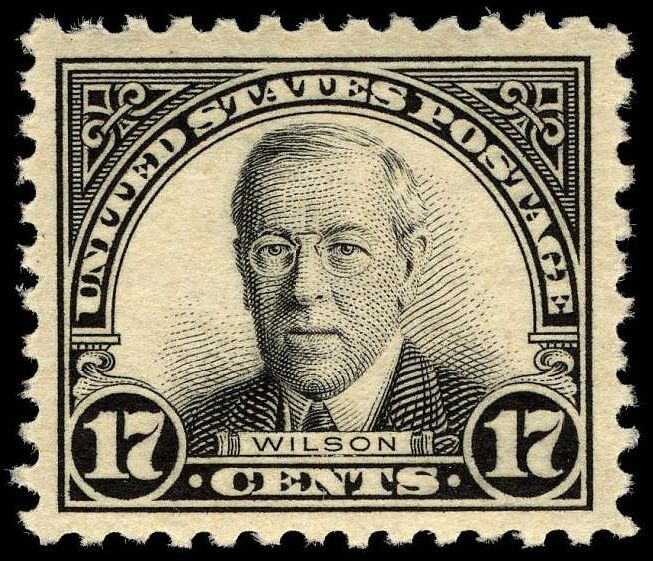
Woodrow Wilson 1925 issue

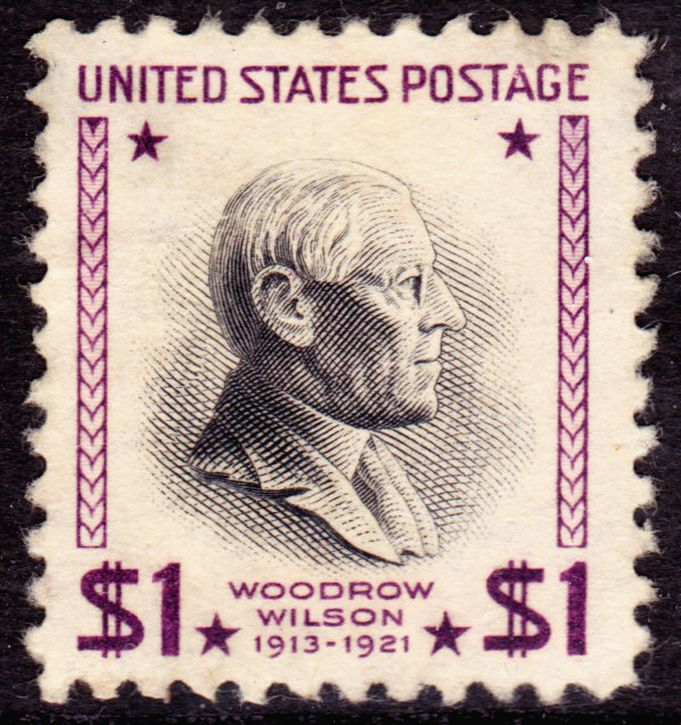
Woodrow Wilson 1938 issue

Woodrow Wilson was honored on the 17-cent Series of 1922, the Fourth Bureau Issue, issued on December 28, 1926. Following his recent death, it can be considered a memorial to Wilson. Wilson's widow provided the photograph which designer Clair Aubrey Huston used for the image. The 17-cent paid the combined first-class postage and registration fee.

Woodrow Wilson appears on the 1-dollar 1938 Presidential Series stamp. The twenty-eighth president of the United States, Wilson led the United States through World War I with a reputation as a peacemaker. In 1920, he became the first American president to win the Nobel Peace Prize. The post office used two-color stamps for the high value rates so that they would not be confused with the cent denominations. The 1-dollar was used for parcels, registered letters and heavier international airmails.

== See also ==
- History of Virginia
- Presidents of the United States on U.S. postage stamps

== Bibliography ==
History

- Dabney, Virginius. Virginia: the new dominion, a history from 1607 to the present 1989. ISBN 978-0-813-91015-4.
- Heinemann, Ronald L., et al., Old Dominion, new commonwealth: a history of Virginia, 1607–2007 2008. ISBN 978-0-813-92769-5.
- Wallenstein, Peter. Cradle of America: four centuries of Virginia history 2007. ISBN 978-0-700-61507-0.

Postage

- Bianculli, Anthony J., Railroad history on American postage stamps 2004.
- Bloomgarden, Henry S., American history through commemorative stamps 1969.
- Deaton, Charles W., The great Texas stamp collection 2012.
- Renfeld, Fred. Commemorative Stamps of the U.S.A.: an illustrated history of our country 1954.
- Woreck, Michael and Jordan Worek. An American history album: the story of the United States told through stamps 2008.
