= Great Americans series =

US postage stamps issued 1980 to 1999

The 78¢ Alice Paul self-adhesive stamp, one of the last in the Great Americans series

The Great Americans series is a set of definitive stamps issued by the United States Postal Service, starting on December 27, 1980, with the 19¢ stamp depicting Sequoyah, and continuing through 1999, the final stamp being the 55¢ Justin S. Morrill self-adhesive stamp. The series, noted for its simplicity and elegance, is a favorite of stamp collectors. It was replaced by the Distinguished Americans series, which began in 2000.

== Design ==
The basic design of the stamps has much in common with the predecessor Americana series and the contemporaneous transportation coils; the few elements consisting only of portrait, name, possibly occupation/notability, inscription "USA", and denomination, in a single color on a white background. The range of subjects was much broader than the previous Prominent Americans series or Liberty Issue. Where the predecessors focused mainly on political figures, the subjects of the Great Americans series were well-known from a number of diverse fields and ethnicities. Only two presidents were subjects of the series: Thomas Jefferson and Harry S. Truman. Balancing the diminished role of presidents was an enormous increase in the prominence of women. Sixteen appear among the Great Americans—a significant contrast to earlier definitive issues: for in the 1965–1978 Prominent Americans series, females had appeared on only two denominations, while 1902, 1922–1925, 1938 and 1954–1965 (Note: Liberty Issue) definitives had each presented only one woman. This was also the first definitive series to offer stamps devoted to notable Native Americans, four of whom were depicted: Red Cloud (10¢), Crazy Horse (13¢), Sequoyah (19¢) and Sitting Bull (28¢). (Note: While the 1922 series had included a 14¢ stamp portraying Hollow Horn Bear, it did not identify him by name but merely labeled him "American Indian".) African-Americans were represented by two stamps, the 20¢ denomination featuring Ralph Bunche and 35¢ stamp depicting Charles Drew.

== Stamps ==
The stamps of the series, ordered by denomination, include:

- 1¢ Dorothea Dix (released September 23, 1983)
- 1¢ Margaret Mitchell (released June 30, 1986)
- 2¢ Igor Stravinsky (released November 18, 1982)
- 2¢ Mary Lyon (released February 28, 1987)
- 3¢ Henry Clay (released July 13, 1983)
- 3¢ Paul Dudley White, M.D. (released September 15, 1986)
- 4¢ Carl Schurz (released June 3, 1983)
- 4¢ Father Flanagan (released July 14, 1986)
- 5¢ Pearl S. Buck (released June 25, 1983)
- 5¢ Hugo Black (released February 27, 1986)
- 5¢ Luis Muñoz Marín (released February 18, 1990)
- 6¢ Walter Lippmann (released September 19, 1985)
- 7¢ Abraham Baldwin (released January 25, 1985)
- 8¢ Henry Knox (released July 25, 1985)
- 9¢ Sylvanus Thayer (released June 7, 1985)
- 10¢ Richard Russell (released May 31, 1984)
- 10¢ Red Cloud (released August 15, 1987)
- 11¢ Alden Partridge (released February 12, 1985)
- 13¢ Crazy Horse (released January 15, 1982)
- 14¢ Sinclair Lewis (released March 21, 1985)
- 14¢ Julia Ward Howe (released February 12, 1987)
- 15¢ Buffalo Bill Cody (released June 6, 1988)
- 17¢ Rachel Carson (released May 28, 1981)
- 17¢ Belva Lockwood (released June 18, 1986)
- 18¢ George Mason (released May 7, 1981)
- 19¢ Sequoyah (released December 27, 1980)
- 20¢ Ralph Bunche (released January 12, 1982)
- 20¢ Thomas H. Gallaudet (released June 10, 1983)
- 20¢ Harry Truman (released January 26, 1984)
- 20¢ Virginia Apgar (released October 24, 1994)
- 21¢ Chester Carlson (released October 21, 1988)
- 22¢ John J. Audubon (released April 23, 1985)
- 23¢ Mary Cassatt (released November 4, 1988)
- 25¢ Jack London (released January 11, 1986)
- 28¢ Sitting Bull (released September 14, 1989)
- 29¢ Earl Warren (released March 9, 1992)
- 29¢ Thomas Jefferson (released April 13, 1993)
- 30¢ Frank C. Laubach (released September 2, 1984)
- 32¢ Milton Hershey (released September 13, 1995)
- 32¢ Cal Farley (released April 26, 1996)
- 32¢ Henry R. Luce (released April 3, 1998)
- 32¢ Lila & DeWitt Wallace (released July 16, 1998)
- 35¢ Charles Drew (released June 3, 1981)
- 35¢ Dennis Chavez (released April 3, 1991)
- 37¢ Robert Millikan (released January 26, 1982)
- 39¢ Grenville Clark (released March 20, 1985)
- 40¢ Lillian Gilbreth (released February 24, 1984)
- 40¢ Claire Chennault (released September 6, 1990)
- 45¢ Harvey Cushing, M.D. (released June 17, 1988)
- 46¢ Ruth Benedict (released October 20, 1995)
- 50¢ Chester W. Nimitz (released February 22, 1985)
- 52¢ Hubert Humphrey (released June 3, 1991)
- 55¢ Alice Hamilton, M.D. (released July 11, 1995)
- 55¢ Justin S. Morrill (released July 17, 1999)
- 56¢ John Harvard (released September 3, 1986)
- 65¢ H. H. "Hap" Arnold (released November 5, 1988)
- 75¢ Wendell Willkie (released February 16, 1992)
- 77¢ Mary Breckinridge (released November 9, 1998)
- 78¢ Alice Paul (released August 18, 1995)
- $1.00 Bernard Revel (released September 23, 1986)
- $1.00 Johns Hopkins (released June 7, 1989)
- $2.00 William Jennings Bryan (released March 19, 1986)
- $5.00 Bret Harte (released August 25, 1987)
