= Definitive stamp =

Postage stamp that is part of the regular issue of a country's stamps

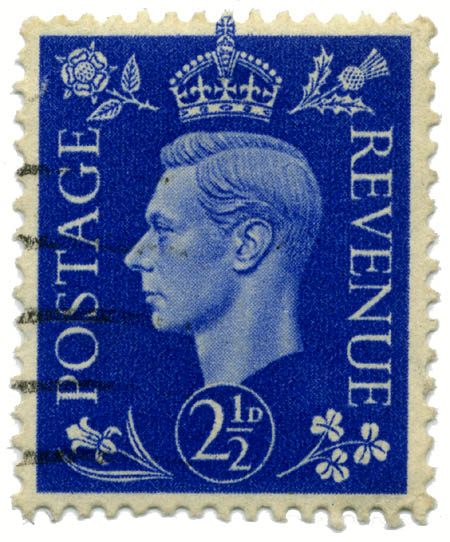
This UK definitive stamp showing King George VI of the United Kingdom was first issued in 1937.

A definitive stamp is a postage stamp that is part of the regular issue of a country's stamps, available for sale by the post office for an extended period of time and designed to serve the everyday postal needs of the country. The term is used in contrast to a "provisional stamp", one that is issued for a temporary period until regular stamps are available, or a "commemorative stamp", a stamp "issued to honor a person or mark a special event" available only for a limited time. Commonly, a definitive issue or series includes stamps in a range of denominations sufficient to cover current postal rates. An "issue" generally means a set that is put on sale all at the same time, while a "series" is spread out over several years, but the terms are not precise. Additional stamps in a series may be produced as needed by changes in postal rates; nevertheless some values may be permanently available, regardless of prevailing rates; examples include 1c or 1p and $1 or £1.

== Range ==
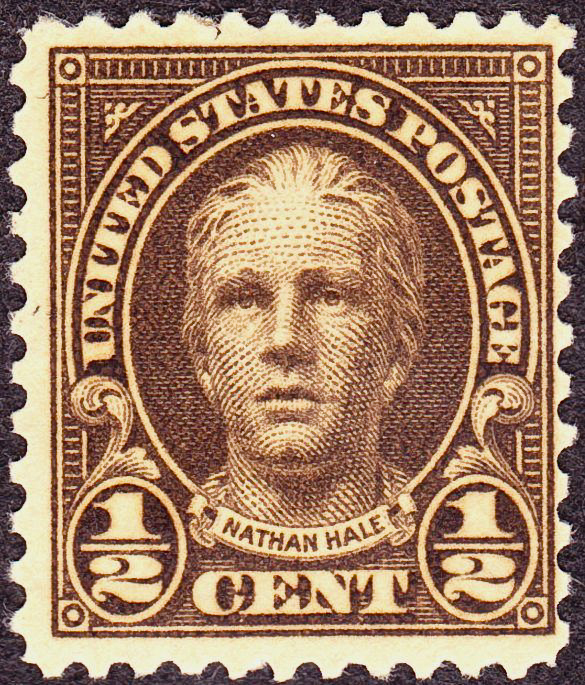
Nathan Hale appeared on US postage stamps issued in 1925 and 1929. Hale's likeness is from a statue by Bela Lyon Pratt.

The range of values varies by era and country, but the focus is on coverage; the values should be sufficient to make up all possible charges using as few stamps as possible. Generally the smallest value will be the smallest unit of currency, or smallest fractional postal rate; for instance, the 1925 regular issue of the United States included a 1/2-cent stamp because some rates were expressed in fractions of a cent per ounce. The highest value of the series is generally quite large, typically from 50 to 100 times the normal letter rate; typical values include one pound, five dollars, etc. Not often seen by the average person, they are most common for parcels.

The in-between values are usually chosen to "make change" efficiently, for instance 1, 2, 5, 10, 20, 50 in a decimal currency. It is common to include all values between 1 and 10, multiples of 5 from 10 to 50, and multiples of 10 from 50 to 100. Additional "oddball" values may reflect specific common rates, and if the series lasts for a period of time, there may be a number of such unusual values as in the UK QE II Machin series below.

Definitives are the workhorse stamps of a country, and as such, they tend to be small, with designs reflecting local culture and history. The definitives of poorer countries will often be very plain and cheaply printed, unlike the large and decorative commemoratives, which are almost pure profit if bought by foreign collectors and never used for postage.

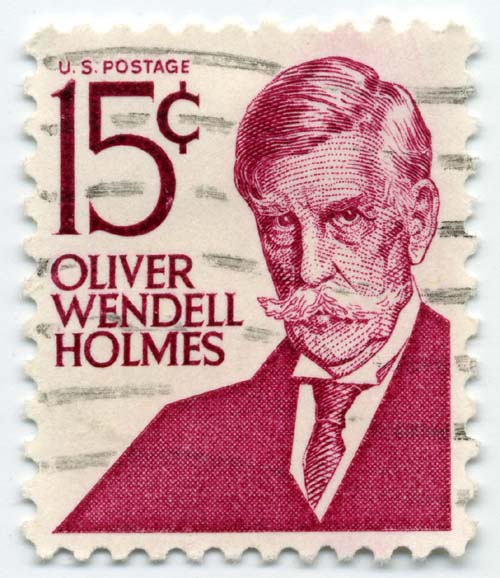
This Prominent Americans series stamp of the United States from 1968 features Oliver Wendell Holmes.

== Frequency of issue ==
Since postal administrations know that many stamp collectors want to own every stamp of a definitive series, and a complete series can be quite expensive, there is always the temptation by governmental bureaucrats to make extra money by frequently issuing new definitive sets, as well as including stamps with very high face values in a set. Collectors' organizations have recommended that administrations only bring out new definitive issues no more often than every five years, and most administrations of the world follow this policy. An exception would be the death of a monarch, or other prominent leader, necessitating a new definitive series for the new ruler. Sometimes merely the portrait is changed, and the outer design (known as the frame) remains the same throughout several issues. Countries that ignore frequency of issue guidelines and issue volumes of stamps that have little to no practical usage produce what many collectors refer to as wallpaper.

== Collecting ==
Since definitive series are issued over a period of time and are reprinted to meet postal demand, they often contain more variation than is typically found in stamps that have a single print run. Switching printing methods and experimenting with phosphors is a common source of variation in modern stamps, while differences in watermarks and perforation are also prevalent, especially in older stamps. Many philatelists study these differences as part of their hobby and try to collect all the varieties of each stamp. Some varieties are particularly rare and can be more valuable than others of the same stamp that may look the same to the casual observer. One notable example of this variation is the Machin stamps of the UK, where philatelists have identified over 1,000 varieties of the same basic design.

Special stamps, such as the Christmas stamps issued annually by various countries, are sometimes regarded as definitives because they are not commemoratives, but they typically only include a limited range of denominations relating specifically to the mail seen on the occasion for which they are issued.

== Notable definitive stamp series ==
- Argentina
  - 1935-1951 Patriots and Natural Resources Issue
- Australia
  - Kangaroo and Map
  - King George V series
- Canada
  - Scroll issue
  - Queen Elizabeth II issue
  - Arch and maple leaf issue
  - War issue
- France
  - Ceres series
  - Navigation and Commerce issue
- Germany
  - Germania
  - Women in German history series
- Greece
  - Hermes Heads
- Norway
  - Post horn series, issued since 1872
- Portugal
  - Ceres series
- Russia
  - Gold Standard issue, produced by the USSR in 1923–1927
- United Kingdom
  - Wilding series
  - Machin series
- United States
  - 1869 Pictorial Issue
  - Series of 1902
  - Washington-Franklin Issues
  - Presidential Issue
  - Liberty issue
  - Prominent Americans series
  - Americana series
  - Great Americans series
  - Transportation coils
  - Distinguished Americans series

== See also ==
- Canadian definitive postage stamps
- Definitive postage stamps of Ireland
- Definitive stamps of Russia
- Definitive stamps of the Soviet Union
