= Sterling Hundley =

American illustrator and painter (born 1976)

- Born: Sterling Clinton Hundley c. 1976
- Education: Virginia Commonwealth University
- Known for: Illustration, Painting

Sterling Clinton Hundley (born 1976) is an American illustrator and painter. He is also the Founder of Legendeer, a community focused on embedding artists back into the world. He is a professor in the Department of Communication Arts at Virginia Commonwealth University. He is also one of five core art instructors at the Illustration Academy, held every summer in Kansas City, Missouri.

Sterling Hundley graduated with a BFA from VCU in 1998. While still a student, his work appeared in the Society of Illustrators Student Scholarship Competition, CMYK, Step by Step Magazine and the Society of Illustrators Annual Competition. During the summers of 1998 and 1999, Sterling attended the Illustration Academy in Kansas City, Missouri.

Hundley's work has appeared in the pages of Communication Arts magazine, American Illustration, Print Magazine, the Los Angeles Society of Illustrators, 3 x 3, Graphis, Step by Step Graphics, the Society of Publication Designers, and the New York Society of Illustrators. Sterling is the recipient of three Gold and two Silver medals from the Society of Illustrators New York, as well as Gold and Silver medals from the Illustrators Club in Washington, D.C. In 2014, Hundley received the "Best Overall" and "Best Illustrated Book" awards from the Victoria & Albert Museum in London England. The same year, Hundley was featured as the "Illustrator of the Year" by Artists & Illustrators Magazine, based in London England.

Hundley has created work for a wide range of clients, including: Rolling Stone, Entertainment Weekly, Arena Stage, Marvel, Atlantic Monthly, the Grammys, GQ, the New Yorker, the Progressive, Vibe, the New York Times, the Los Angeles Times, the Washington Post, Red Bull, HarperCollins, Penguin/Putnam, Random House, Scholastic, Knopf, Sterling Publishing, Major League Baseball, and Virginia Living Magazine. In 2014, Hundley illustrated the classic "Treasure Island" for The Folio Society in London, England.

Hundley has served as a juror for the Society of Illustrators, 3 x 3 Magazine, the Society of Illustrators Scholarship Competition, and CMYK magazine. He has lectured extensively at Syracuse University, CCAD, Maryland Institute College of Art, the Eisner Museum, Milwaukee Institute of Art and Design, Academy of Art University, Ringling College of Art and Design, Virginia Commonwealth University, and the Illustrator's Club of Washington D.C., Maryland and Virginia, and as a co-curator for the "Tables to Walls" exhibit at the Quirk gallery in Richmond, Virginia.

Hundley's work was featured on the 15th stamp in the United States Postal Service Distinguished Americans series. The stamp honors C. Alfred "Chief" Anderson, an American aviator who is known as "The Father of Black Aviation".
