= Special stamp =

A special stamp is a type of postage stamp typically intended for use on special occasions and holidays that occur repeatedly. Christmas stamps, with a seasonal design, and used in vast numbers to mail Christmas cards, are the most familiar, but in recent years a number of other types have appeared.

The characteristics separating special stamps from definitive stamps and commemorative stamps are not precise; like definitives, they are "working stamps" printed in large quantities and mostly used on mails, but they also commemorate specific occasions and typically have a more elaborate and attractive design. Unlike commemoratives, they are issued some weeks in advance of the occasion being marked, so that they are available during the season of interest.

In addition to Christmas, many other holidays have been marked by special stamps; Japan has long issued New Year's Day stamps for postcards, and other nations have followed suit. Many nations also issue stamps for their independence day, United Nations Day, and other official national holidays, although these tend to have the character of commemoratives; the populace does not usually send special cards or letters to mark these days.

Love stamps are designed around a love theme. In the United States, they were first issued in 1973. Generally timed to appear before Valentine's Day, they are also used on wedding invitations throughout the year.

The United Kingdom and United States have issued various greeting card stamps with slogans replicating standard greeting card topics, such as "Happy Birthday!" and "Get Well!". These seem not to have been especially successful, and are not often seen on mail.

== See also ==
- Holiday stamp
