= Albert Forsythe =

Albert Forsythe may refer to:

- Albert P. Forsythe (1830–1906), US politician
- Albert Ernest Forsythe (1897–1986), American physician
