= Presidential Issue =

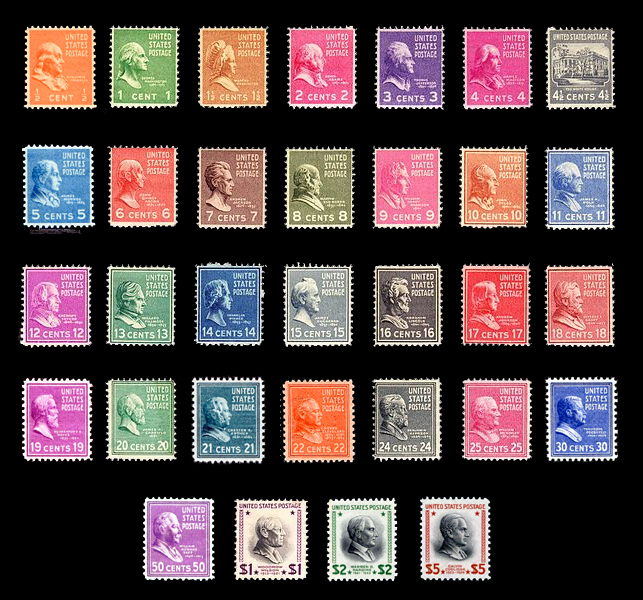
Presidential issue of 1938 -

The Presidential Issue, nicknamed the Prexies by collectors, is the series of definitive postage stamps issued in the United States in 1938, featuring all 29 U.S. presidents who were in office between 1789 and 1928, from George Washington to Calvin Coolidge. The presidents appear as small profile busts printed in solid-color designs through 50¢, and then as black on white images surrounded by colored lettering and ornamentation for $1, $2, and $5 values. Additional stamps in fractional-cent denominations offer busts of Benjamin Franklin and Martha Washington, as well as an engraving of the White House. With its total of 32 stamps, this was the largest definitive series yet issued by the U. S. Post Office.

In 1933 President Franklin D. Roosevelt, himself a serious stamp collector, fostered the idea of a set of stamps honoring all the deceased past presidents of the United States. A national contest was held in 1937 to choose a designer for the first stamp of the series, the 1-cent George Washington issue. More than eleven hundred entries were submitted, some from famous artists. An artist from New York, Elaine Rawlinson, won the contest. Her design for the 1-cent stamp showed Washington in profile, modeled after a bust by the famous sculptor Jean-Antoine Houdon, and became the template for the new definitive series issued in 1938.

== The Presidential Issues of 1938 ==
The models for the engravings used in the printing of the various issues were obtained from a number of different sources, from paintings to sculptures to bronze statues, all reproduced in a relatively uniform intaglio style on steel dies. The overall stamp design incorporates a solid background of color. On the values up to 50-cents, the name of each subject appears in capital letters to the right of the bust, with the years of his presidential tenure beneath it (no dates are provided for the non-presidents Franklin and Martha Washington). On denominations from 10-cents through 19-cents a single-line border is added, while a double-line border surrounds the values between 20 and 50 cents. The 1, 2 and 5-dollar values have their own design which places colored columns and stars on either side of the black-and-white presidential portrait, and displays the president's name and the dates of his tenure beneath his image.

Selected Issues

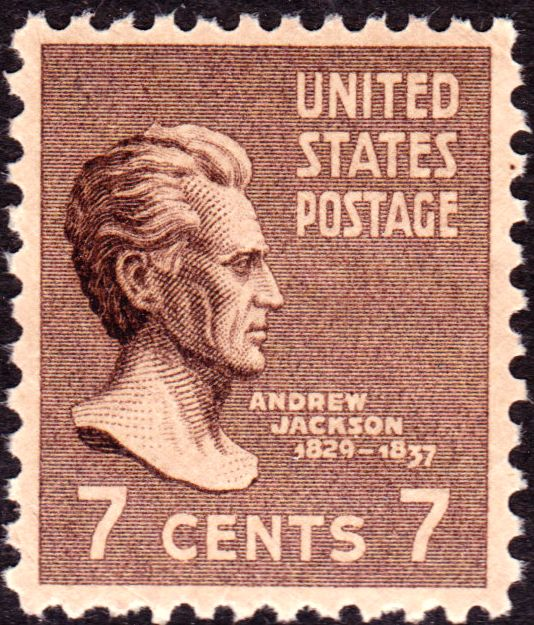
Andrew Jackson Model for engraving, Kinney-Scholz bronze statue, in U.S. Capitol

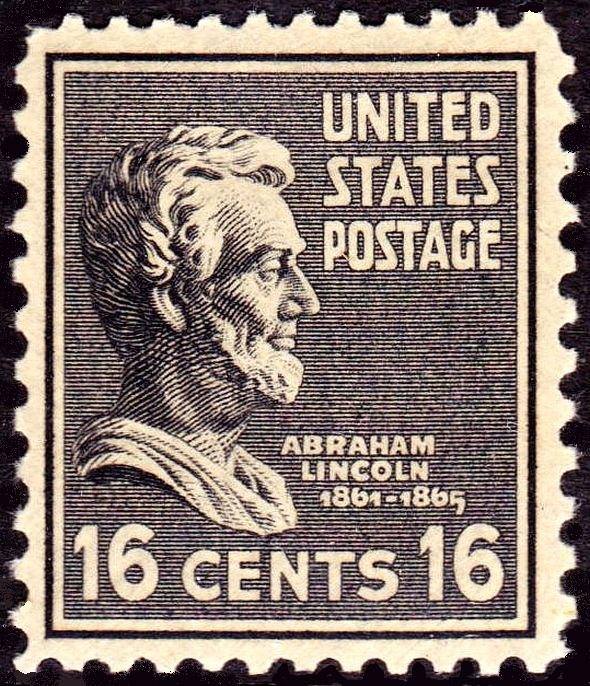
Abraham Lincoln Portrait taken from bust of Lincoln by sculptor Sarah Fisher Ames

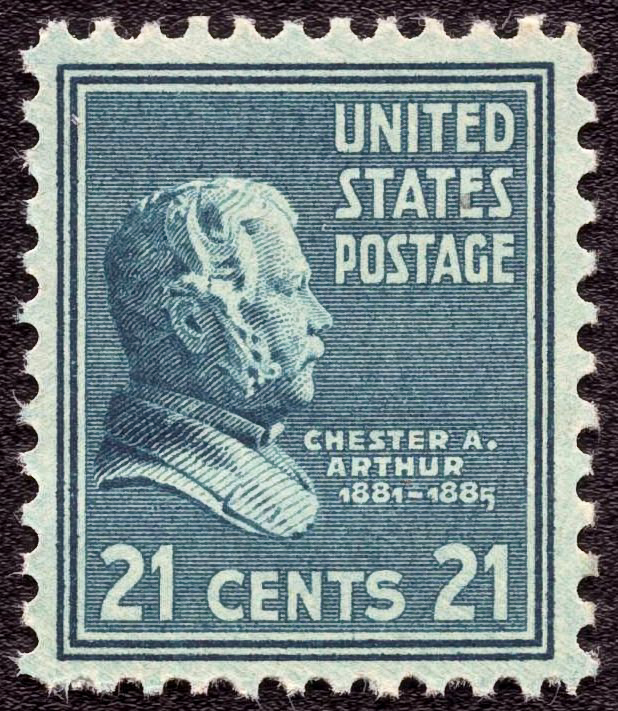
Chester A. Arthur from a marble bust by Augustus Saint-Gaudens

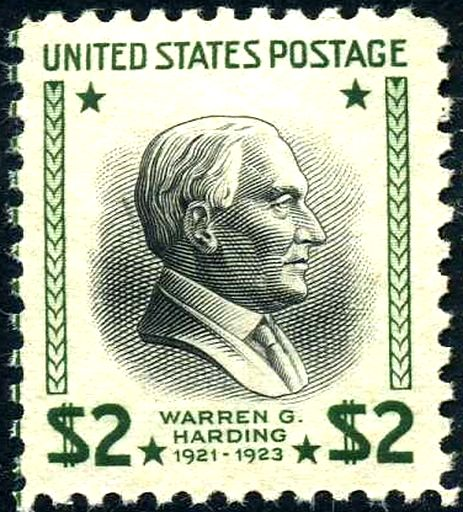
Warren G. Harding Engraving modeled after a medal struck by George T. Morgan of the US Mint

== Design competition ==
On June 22, 1937, the Treasury Department announced a national design competition for a new regular series of postage stamps, with a submission deadline of September 15, 1937, offering prizes of $500, $300 and $200 for the three top entrants. The panel of judges included philatelic specialists and art experts. Several eliminations took place for the more than eleven hundred submitted designs, and the remaining entries were scored on a graduating scale. From these the first prize went to Elaine Rawlinson of New York City, the second to Charles Bauer of West Orange, New Jersey, third to Edwin Hoyt Austin of Delmar, New York. The winning design is reported to not have been voted in first place by any of the judges.

Some entrants submitted multiple designs, among them J.S. Stevenson, an employee of the American Banknote Company (two designs) and Thomas F. Morris Jr., son of the Bureau of Engraving and Printing's first chief of the engraving division (four designs).

== Issued stamps ==
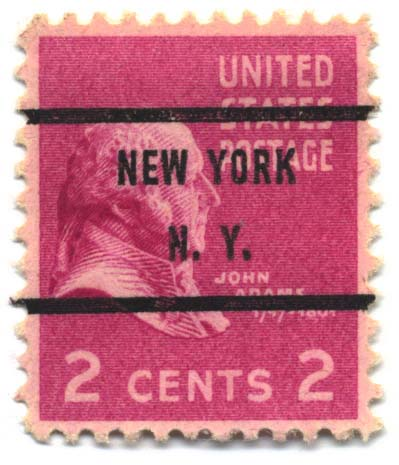
Stamp with precancel

The issued stamps conform to Rawlinson's prize-winning design, with, as already noted, some modifications in bordering on higher denominations; these, however, are unobtrusive enough so that an impression of overall uniformity is preserved. Values from 1/2 cent through 50 cents were printed in sheets on a rotary press and perforated 11 x 10 1/2, while the two-colored 1, 2 and 5 dollar stamps required flat-plate printing and were perforated 11 on all sides. Beyond honoring the presidents, the series, in effect, cunningly encoded the historical position of each in a visual mnemonic: for the first 22 presidents appear on the single cent values in the order of their accession, with George Washington, the first president, on the 1¢, James Knox Polk, the eleventh president, on the 11¢ and Grover Cleveland, the twenty-second president, on the 22¢ stamp. Cleveland's two non-consecutive presidencies disrupt the series, as he stood as both the twenty-second and twenty-fourth president. In strict order, a twenty-four cent stamp should have been excluded from the Prexies—but to eliminate this denomination, which had many postal applications, while including the useless twenty-three cent value would have been perverse. Thus, the twenty-third president, Benjamin Harrison, appears on the 24¢ stamp, and president number twenty-five, William McKinley restores the alignment on the 25¢ denomination. The higher values thereafter part company with the numerical list of presidencies, beginning with Theodore Roosevelt (number twenty-six) on the 30¢ denomination. Of the 29 presidents in the series, 12 had never before appeared on a United States postage stamp; and the Prexies also presented four denominations not found on any previous U. S. stamps: 18¢, 19¢, 21¢ and 22¢. These and some other values had been included solely for the educational purpose of placing the presidents in proper numerical order: they did not correspond to any current postal rate. As aforesaid, the non-presidential images of Benjamin Franklin, Martha Washington and the White House were used, respectively, on the 1/2¢, 1 1/2¢ and 4 1/2¢ values. Apparently, it was not originally planned to match the presidents with their numerical positions, for James Monroe was initially announced as the subject of the 4 1/2¢ stamp.

Ironically, given the historical concept behind the series, the prexies departed from tradition in several significant ways. It was the first definitive series of postage stamps since 1870 in which George Washington did NOT appear on the normal letter rate, for numerical order placed Thomas Jefferson on the 3¢ value required for letters in 1938. Washington, instead, satisfied the post-card rate on the 1¢ stamp—and this, too, broke with tradition, which had almost invariably presented Franklin on that value. Franklin did, however, as on many previous definitive issues, begin the series, appearing on the 1/2¢ stamp, which, in effect, informally honored him as the "halfth" president.

It may be said that several aspects of the Prexies series—its concept as a painless public history lesson and its egalitarian treatment of all presidents irrespective of their differing achievements—are very much in accord with the New Deal ethos of the administration that issued it.

=== Coil and booklet stamps ===
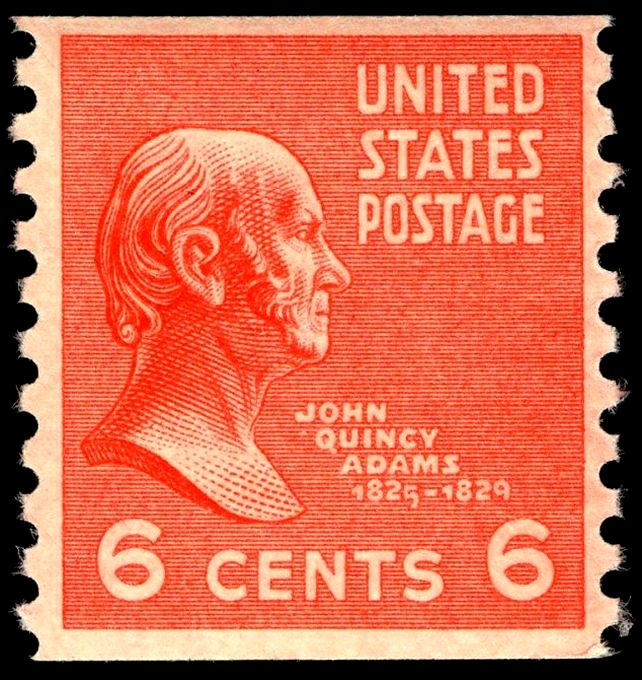
John Quincy Adams Coil stamp w/ vertical perf's

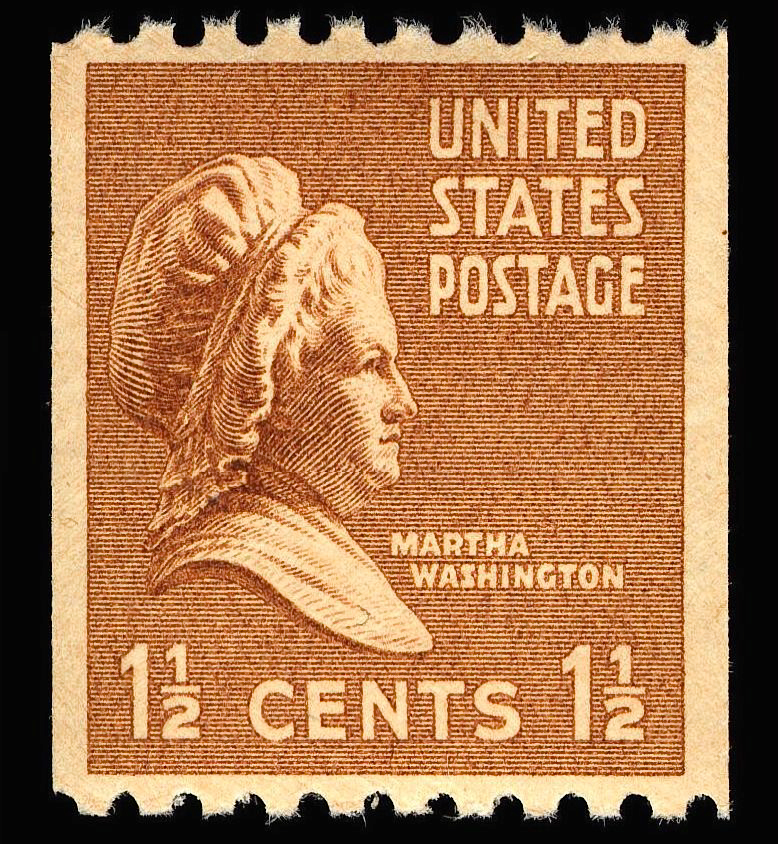
Martha Washington Coil stamp w/ horizontal perf's

On January 20, 1939, nine values were issued in coil form, consisting of all low values from 1¢ to 6¢, and the 10¢, all perforated 10 vertically. On January 27, the four values from 1¢ to 3¢ were also issued in vertical coil form, perforated 10 horizontally; and that same day, booklets offering the 1¢, 2¢ and 3¢ denominations went on sale, perforated 11 x 10 1/2.

=== An Anomalous Watermark ===
A reprinting of the $1 Wilson denomination in 1950 or 1951 inadvertently resulted in the first watermarked U. S. postage stamp issued since 1916. For this printing run, the technicians inadvertently failed to use normal postage stamp paper, but instead employed a batch of revenue-stamp paper watermarked with copies of the logo "U S I R." in double-line letters. (When any stamp from this run is immersed in a special watermark-detecting fluid, part of one or more letters becomes visible.) While examples of the watermarked $1 stamp are not inordinately rare, they still command some thirty times the price of normal unwatermarked copies. (U S I R watermarks had last accidentally appeared on U. S. postage stamps in 1895, when revenue paper had been used for some sheets of 6-cent and 8-cent stamps of the definitive issue then current.)

The presidential issues was long-lived among United States definitive postal series. It was only after sixteen years, in 1954, that the postal service began to supersede its denominations, gradually replacing them with stamps of the so-called Liberty series over the next several years.

== Collecting Prexies ==
One of the (difficult) games for Prexie collectors is to find a cover with, for instance, a single 16¢ stamp that pays a combination of rate and fees valid during the Prexies' period of usage. Many such covers remain to be discovered; some sellers on eBay have been surprised to discover a seemingly ordinary-looking cover bid up to several hundred dollars because it was one of the sought-after solo usages.

== Dates of issue and Scott catalog number ==
- Scott 803 – The 1/2¢ Benjamin Franklin – May 19
- Scott 804 – The 1¢ George Washington – April 25
- Scott 805 – The 1 1/2¢ Martha Washington – May 5
- Scott 806 – The 2¢ John Adams – June 3 (first appearance on a U. S. stamp)
- Scott 807 – The 3¢ Thomas Jefferson – June 16
- Scott 808 – The 4¢ James Madison – July 1
- Scott 809 – The 4 1/2¢ White House – July 11
- Scott 810 – The 5¢ James Monroe – July 21
- Scott 811 – The 6¢ John Quincy Adams – July 28 (first appearance on a U. S. stamp)
- Scott 812 – The 7¢ Andrew Jackson – August 4

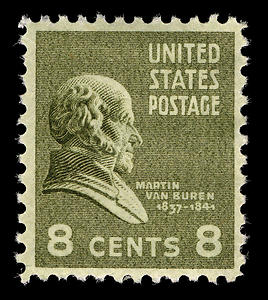
Martin Van Buren, 8 cents

- Scott 813 – The 8¢ Martin Van Buren – August 11 (first appearance on a U. S. stamp)
- Scott 814 – The 9¢ William Henry Harrison – August 18 (first appearance on a U. S. stamp)
- Scott 815 – The 10¢ John Tyler – September 2 (first appearance on a U. S. stamp)
- Scott 816 – The 11¢ James K. Polk – September 8 (first appearance on a U. S. stamp)
- Scott 817 – The 12¢ Zachary Taylor – September 14
- Scott 818 – The 13¢ Millard Fillmore – September 22 (first appearance on a U. S. stamp)
- Scott 819 – The 14¢ Franklin Pierce – October 6 (first appearance on a U. S. stamp)
- Scott 820 – The 15¢ James Buchanan – October 13 (first appearance on a U. S. stamp)
- Scott 821 – The 16¢ Abraham Lincoln – October 20
- Scott 822 – The 17¢ Andrew Johnson – October 27 (first appearance on a U. S. stamp)
- Scott 823 – The 18¢ Ulysses S. Grant – November 3
- Scott 824 – The 19¢ Rutherford B. Hayes – November 10
- Scott 825 – The 20¢ James A. Garfield – November 10
- Scott 826 – The 21¢ Chester A. Arthur – November 22 (first appearance on a U. S. stamp)
- Scott 827 – The 22¢ Grover Cleveland – November 22
- Scott 828 – The 24¢ Benjamin Harrison – December 2
- Scott 829 – The 25¢ William McKinley – December 2
- Scott 830 – The 30¢ Theodore Roosevelt – December 8
- Scott 831 – The 50¢ William Howard Taft – December 8
- Scott 832 – The $1 Woodrow Wilson – August 29
- Scott 833 – The $2 Warren G. Harding – September 29
- Scott 834 – The $5 Calvin Coolidge – November 17 (first appearance on a U. S. stamp)

== See also ==
- 1932 Washington Bicentennial
- Presidents of the United States on U.S. postage stamps
- Washington-Franklin Issues
- AMERIPEX Presidential issue of 1986
- Presidents and the Civil War on postage stamps

Preceded by Fourth Bureau issue (see also: US Regular Issues of 1922–1931)	US Definitive postage stamps 1938–1954	Succeeded by Liberty Issue

== References and sources ==
Notes

Sources

- Rustad, Roland E. (1994). Leo Piszkiewicz (ed.). The Prexies (La Posta Monograph, Volume 2). Bureau Issues Association. ISBN 0-930412-23-0.
- Helbock, Richard W. (1988). Prexy Postal History.
- Scott catalogue
