= Ernest H. Buehl Sr. =

American aviator (1897–1990)

Ernest H. Buehl Sr. (1897–1990) was a German-born aviator and aviation figure. He opened three airports and trained hundreds of pilots, including C. Alfred Anderson, who became the lead trainer of the Tuskegee Airmen.

== Early life and training ==
Buehl had older brothers who influenced his early interest in aviation, including Fritz, who was also interested in aviation.

=== Rapp and BMW ===
Early in his career, Buehl worked at BMW as an aviation mechanic. He left employment at BMW in 1920, when he immigrated to the United States. While at BMW, Buehl was employed in manufacturing aircraft engines. While there, Buehl was a mechanic responsible for preparing Franz Zeno Diemer's BMW IV engine for his unofficial world record flight into the stratosphere on June 17, 1919.

== Immigration, Transcontinental airmail, and the JL-6 ==
Buehl came to the United States in 1920, to work with John M. Larsen, who was marketing the BMW-powered Junkers F13:

- 1920, as co-pilot to Bert Acosta, opened the first transcontinental airmail route
- 1921, opened air routes to Canadian oil fields
- 1922, prepared aircraft for Roald Amundsen, for an attempt to fly over the North Pole

== Brock and Weymouth ==
Buehl began to work for Brock & Weymouth, doing aerial map survey work, in 1923. During the period he worked for them, in 1926 he obtained his first official pilot’s license. It was signed by Orville Wright. Also, he had time to develop his own side business: Flying Dutchman Air Service and flying school, in 1927.

== The Flying Dutchman ==
As “The Flying Dutchman,” Buehl worked to promote general aviation:

- 1928, opened his first airport, at Somerton
- 1930, began to work with C. Alfred Anderson, to help Anderson prepare for the Air Transport license. In 1932 he forcefully interceded when the flight inspector stated he would not examine Anderson
- during World War II, Buehl trained Navy cadets at Franklin & Marshall College, leading a team of 23 instructors
- 1949, opened his second airport, at Eddington, in 1949
- 1960, opened his third airport, at Langhorne

== Death ==
Buehl died on 25 May 1990.
