= Distinguished Americans series =

US postage stamps issued since 2000

The Distinguished Americans series is a set of definitive stamps issued by the United States Postal Service which was started in 2000 with a 10¢ stamp depicting Joseph Stilwell. The designs of the first nine issues are reminiscent of the earlier Great Americans series, but less austere. The first nine issues were done with black lines on a white background, but in 2008, with the James A. Michener issue (#10), the USPS added color toning. Like the Great Americans series, the first twelve issues measured 0.84 inches by 0.99 inches overall, and were all designed by Mark Summers of Waterdown, Ontario. In 2011, with the Oveta Culp Hobby stamp, the series went to a larger format with full color images and colored backgrounds.

The 2004 Rudolph stamp is the only one in the series to have been issued in both a sheet (pane) and booklet format. Both the 2001 Caraway issue and the 2002–2003 Ferber issues have perforation differences.

The stamps issued in this series include the following (rank, date of issue, denomination, depicted person):

1. 2000, August 24. 10¢. General Joseph W. Stilwell.
2. 2000, September 7. 33¢. Senator Claude Pepper.
3. 2001, February 21. 76¢. Senator Hattie W. Caraway.
4. 2002, July 29. 83¢. Author Edna Ferber. Reissued in 2003 with 11¼ x 11¼ perforations.
5. 2004, July 14. 23¢. Athlete Wilma Rudolph
6. 2006, March 9. 63¢. Medical scientist Jonas Salk.
7. 2006, March 9. 87¢. Virologist Albert Sabin.
8. 2007, June 13. 58¢. Senator Margaret Chase Smith.
9. 2007, June 13. 75¢. Author Harriet Beecher Stowe.
10. 2008, May 12. 59¢. Author James A. Michener.
11. 2008, May 12. 76¢. Physician Edward Trudeau.
12. 2009, May 15. 78¢. Philanthropist Mary Lasker.
13. 2011, April 15. 84¢, first-class mail, three-ounce rate stamp. Stateswoman Oveta Culp Hobby.
14. 2012, April 26. Forever. Actor José Ferrer.
15. 2014, March 13. 70¢, first-class mail, two-ounce rate stamp. Aviator C. Alfred "Chief" Anderson.
16. 2017, April 11. 70¢, first-class mail, two-ounce rate stamp. Teacher, pioneer of deaf studies Robert Panara.
17. 2022, November 1. 70¢, first-class mail, two-ounce rate stamp. Publisher, first female head of a Fortune 500 company Katharine Graham.
18. 2025, September 17. first-class mail, two-ounce rate stamp. Humanitarian Elie Wiesel.

Preceded by Great Americans series and Transportation coils	US Definitive postage stamps since 2000	Succeeded by not specified yet
