= C. Alfred "Chief" Anderson =

Tuskegee Airmen flight instructor (1907–1996)

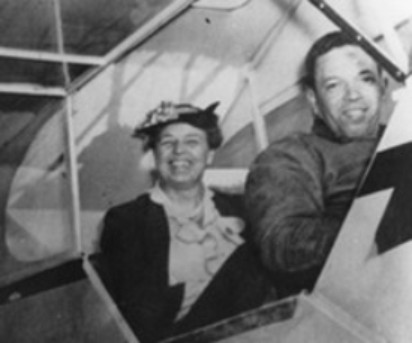
- April 11, 1941, C. Alfred "Chief" Anderson and First Lady Eleanor Roosevelt The Flight That Changed History.
- Born: Charles Alfred Anderson Sr., February 9, 1907; Bryn Mawr, Pennsylvania, US
- Died: April 13, 1996 (aged 89); Tuskegee, Alabama, US
- Monuments: Tuskegee Airmen National Historic Site, Tuskegee Alabama
- Known for: Father of Black Aviation
- Spouse: Gertrude Nelson Anderson
- Relatives: Charles A. Anderson Jr., (Son); Christina L. Anderson (Granddaughter)
- Awards: Honorary doctorate from Tuskegee University, 2013 Enshrinee National Aviation Hall of Fame, Featured on 70 cents Distinguished Americans postage stamp (2014), Induction into the National Center of Modeling and Simulation Hall of Fame (2018)
- Aviation career
- First flight: Velie Monocoupe
- Famous flights: Eleanor Roosevelt, and Chief Anderson's monumental flight
- Flight license: 1929 Private Pilot License, Pennsylvania; 1932 Transport Pilot License, Pennsylvania
- Air force: ARMY Air Corps
- Battles: Chief Flight Instructor for the Tuskegee Airmen WWII
- Rank: Ground Commander

Charles Alfred Anderson Sr., (February 9, 1907 – April 13, 1996) was an American aviator who is known as the father of black aviation. He earned the nickname "Chief" as chief flight instructor of the Tuskegee Airmen.

== Early life ==
Born in Bryn Mawr, Pennsylvania, to Iverson and Janie Anderson, young Charles was fascinated by airplanes and knew he had to fly. By the time he was 20, he had saved enough money for flying lessons; however, no one would teach a young black man to fly. Not deterred, Anderson attended aviation ground school, learned airplane mechanics, and hung around airports, picking up information from white pilots wherever he could.

== Learning to fly ==
Realizing the only way he would learn to fly was by owning his own airplane, he purchased a Velie Monocoupe with savings and loans from friends and family. Members of a flying club eventually allowed him to join, but the instruction was not offered. Taxiing his airplane around the field, Anderson would periodically gun the engine, eventually finding himself aloft. With growing confidence, it was not long before the he taught himself to take off—and land—safely.

One club member and experienced pilot, Russell Thaw, had no airplane but sought to visit his mother on weekends in Atlantic City. A bargain was struck—Thaw would rent and fly Anderson's Monocoupe, and Anderson could come along, gaining valuable cross country experience. Thus was Anderson able to earn his pilot's license in August 1929. Seeking to obtain an air transport pilot's license but again finding race an obstacle, help finally came from Ernest H. Buehl, known as "The Flying Dutchman," a German aviator who had been invited to come to the United States in 1920 to help open transcontinental airmail routes. Under Buehl's tutelage and personal insistence, in February 1932, Anderson became the first African American to receive an air transport pilot's license from the Civil Aeronautics Administration.

== Pre-WWII life ==
On June 24, 1932, Anderson married his childhood sweetheart, Gertrude Nelson of Ardmore, Pennsylvania. The Andersons would eventually have two sons. In July 1933, Anderson met Dr. Albert E. Forsythe, a black physician and pilot who shared his goal of introducing fellow blacks to the field of aviation. Record-setting and attention-getting flights proved effective. Among these was the pair's first transcontinental round trip flight by black pilots, from Atlantic City, New Jersey, to Los Angeles, California.

The duo made additional 'first flights' for blacks to Canada and throughout the United States, capturing worldwide attention in the summer of 1934 when they flew their new Lambert Monocoupe, christened the Booker T. Washington, on a Pan American Good Will Tour. By September 1938, Anderson was instructing in the Washington, D.C. area where, while operating a Piper Cub, he was hired as a flight instructor for the Civilian Pilot Training Program at Howard University.

== Tuskegee Airmen and WWII ==
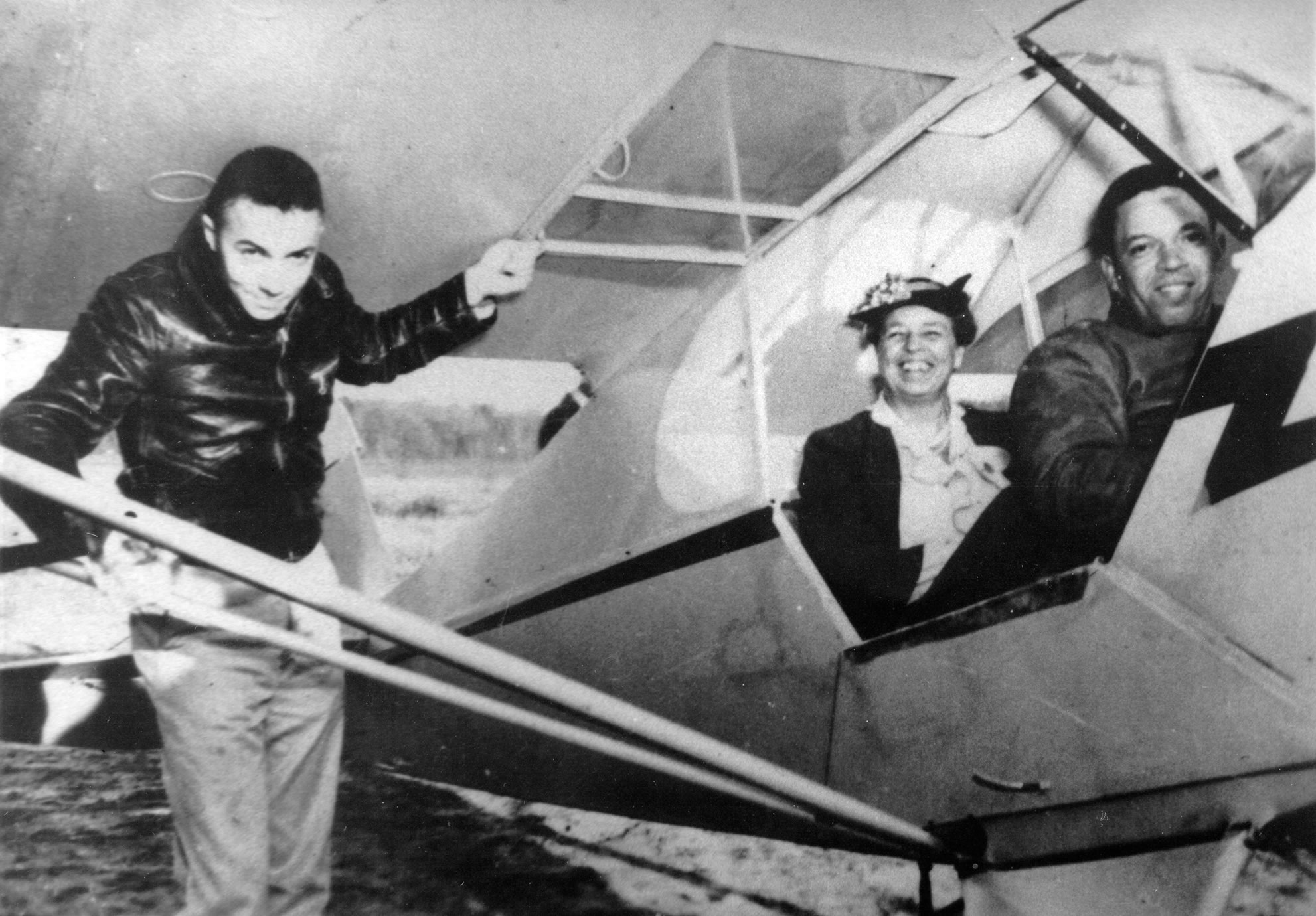
Anderson (right) with First Lady Eleanor Roosevelt, April 11, 1941

In 1940, Anderson was recruited by the Tuskegee Institute in Tuskegee, Alabama, to serve as the Chief Civilian Flight Instructor for the new Army Civilian Pilot Training Program (CPTP). Anderson was tasked to develop a pilot training program, taught the program's first advanced course, and earned his nickname; his students gave him the nickname "Chief" and it stuck for the remainder of his life.

On April 11, 1941 First Lady Eleanor Roosevelt was touring the institute's children's hospital. Unaware of the flight program, she noticed airplanes flying in the air and asked to meet its chief instructor. The First Lady told Anderson she had always heard that "colored people couldn't fly," but it appeared that he could. "I'm just going to have a take flight with you," she said. Anderson was not about to turn down the First Lady, despite the protests of her security detail. Upon returning 40 minutes later, Anderson's delighted passenger exclaimed, "Well I see you can fly, all right!" That momentous flight is better known as "The Flight That Changed History". As of then, blacks had never flown for the Army Air Corps. No doubt her experience was a boost to the Roosevelt administration, which had just established the Tuskegee Airmen Experiment to explore if it was possible to train black pilots for military service. Anderson went on to train other famous military aviation pioneers such as General Benjamin O. Davis Jr. and General Daniel "Chappie" James Jr.

By June 1941, Anderson was selected by the Army as Tuskegee's Ground Commander and Chief Instructor for aviation cadets of the 99th Pursuit Squadron, America's first all-black fighter squadron. The 99th would eventually join three other squadrons of Tuskegee Airmen in the 332nd Fighter Group, known as the Red Tails. The 450 Tuskegee Airmen who saw combat flew 1,378 combat missions, destroyed 260 enemy planes, and earned over 150 Distinguished Flying Crosses, among numerous other awards.

== Post-WWII life ==
Anderson's postwar contributions to aviation continued at Moton Field located in Tuskegee, Alabama, providing ground and flight training to both black and white students under the G.I. Bill, and in 1951, training Army and Air Force ROTC cadets along with private students. He also provided aircraft and engine maintenance and sold aircraft in the Southeast and Southwestern United States. In 1967, Anderson co-founded the non-profit Negro Airmen International (NAI), the nation's oldest African-American pilot organization in the world. Through his non-profit, Anderson was able to establish a summer flight academy for youth interested in aviation, and he continued to instruct students until 1989.

== Death ==
On April 13, 1996, Anderson died peacefully at home surrounded by family in Tuskegee, Alabama.

== Legacy ==
In 2012 Christina L. Anderson, his granddaughter, created the C. Alfred "Chief" Anderson Legacy Foundation, Inc., in order to continue the legacy of Chief Anderson and the Tuskegee Airmen.

== Accolades ==
In addition to hundreds of other notable awards received throughout his life, on October 4, 2013, Anderson was enshrined in the National Aviation Hall of Fame. This honor is the most prestigious award an aviator can receive in America. Anderson entered the Hall of Fame with fellow class of 2013 enshrinees: Vietnam War hero Major General Patrick Henry Brady, famed NASA astronaut Captain Robert L. "Hoot" Gibson, and Cessna aircraft innovator Dwane L. Wallace.

In March 2014, the United States Postal Service announced that it would release a stamp commemorating Anderson on March 13, 2014. This stamp is the 15th stamp in the Distinguished Americans series. The stamp was designed by art director Phil Jordan, and Anderson's portrait on the stamp was painted by Sterling Hundley, showing Anderson wearing headgear worn by pilots in World War II.
