= Americana series =

US postage stamp series

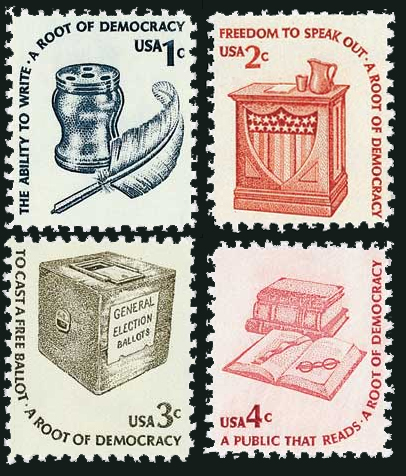
"Roots of Democracy" block (1c through 4c)

The Americana series was a series of United States definitive postage stamps issued between 1975 and 1981. Denominations ranged from one cent to five dollars. It superseded the Prominent Americans series and was in turn superseded by the Great Americans series and the Transportation coils. The series consisted of twenty stamps issued in sheets, twelve issued in coils, and one produced especially for a booklet.

While the stamps were not part of the Bicentennial Series of stamps released from 1971-1983, their theme fit in well with the idea of looking back over two hundred years. The series celebrated basic American concepts that have animated the nation's entire history, rather than individual heroes or heroines from any particular period. Unlike any previous definitive series, the Americana set did not contain a single image of a president (an omission that may perhaps reflect national disillusion in the wake of the recent Watergate scandal). Indeed, this was the first American definitive series in which no male human being appeared, and the two female figures in the set are purely allegorical, rather than representing actual women.

The preceding Prominent Americans series had been deliberately produced without basic design guidelines, resulting in widely diverse pictorial and lettering styles. In clear contrast, the Americana series strictly followed a uniform plan that dictated the appearance both of individual stamps and of stamps grouped together in blocks of four. Each denomination is framed on two adjacent sides by text (generally relating to American history or freedoms) which curves around one corner of the stamp. The twenty sheet-stamps are planned so that, in a group of four rising values, the curve cycles through the four corners: top left, top right, bottom left, and bottom right. Each of the five resulting blocks accordingly appears with text that completely surrounds its perimeter, forming a rectangular border with rounded corners.

All five blocks have themes: The first, "Roots of Democracy," the second, "Rights and Freedoms of the American People," the third, "Symbols of America," the fourth, "Pioneer America" and the fifth, "America's Light". (The framing plan was only partially carried out with the coil stamps of the series. Among the twelve stamps, only two blocks can be formed, and only one of these proves thematic.)

The Americana series was the first definitive issue since that of 1922-31 not to include any fractional-cent values; instead, it presented the first decimal values assigned to U.S. Postage stamps, which appeared on coil stamps denominated between 3.1 cents and 8.4 cents, produced for the use of bulk mailers and other businesses.

The CIA invert error, Scott 1610c

Among philatelists, the Americana series is most famous for the CIA invert. An invert error of the $1 lamp stamp, it was so named because the original sheet was bought by a CIA employee who had gone to the post office to buy some stamps. Copies have sold at auction for as much as $15,000.

The 16-cent and the 29-cents were issued for a proposed but never implemented "business rate" for first class mail, which was to be higher than the personal rate (only letters with handwritten addresses would be eligible for the lower rate). The proposed rate was rejected by the Postal Rate Commission which chose instead a 15-cent rate (for two ounces, 28-cents) for all mail. Since the 16 and 29-cent stamps satisfied no rate, and were not a convenient round number, they saw little use.

The design for the 1-cent stamp was originally designated for a never-issued 26-cent stamps.

Many of the stamps were issued in mid-November in New York City. At the time, it was usual to have a stamp issuance during the annual stamp show for the American Stamp Dealers Association, which was then held in mid-November in New York City. The March stamps issued in New York were issued at the ASDA-sponsored INTERPEX show.

The series was the first American omnibus definitive series since 1875 not to include a five-cent stamp.

== Denominations, subject, inscription, place and date of issue ==
Sheet stamps:

=== Roots of Democracy ===
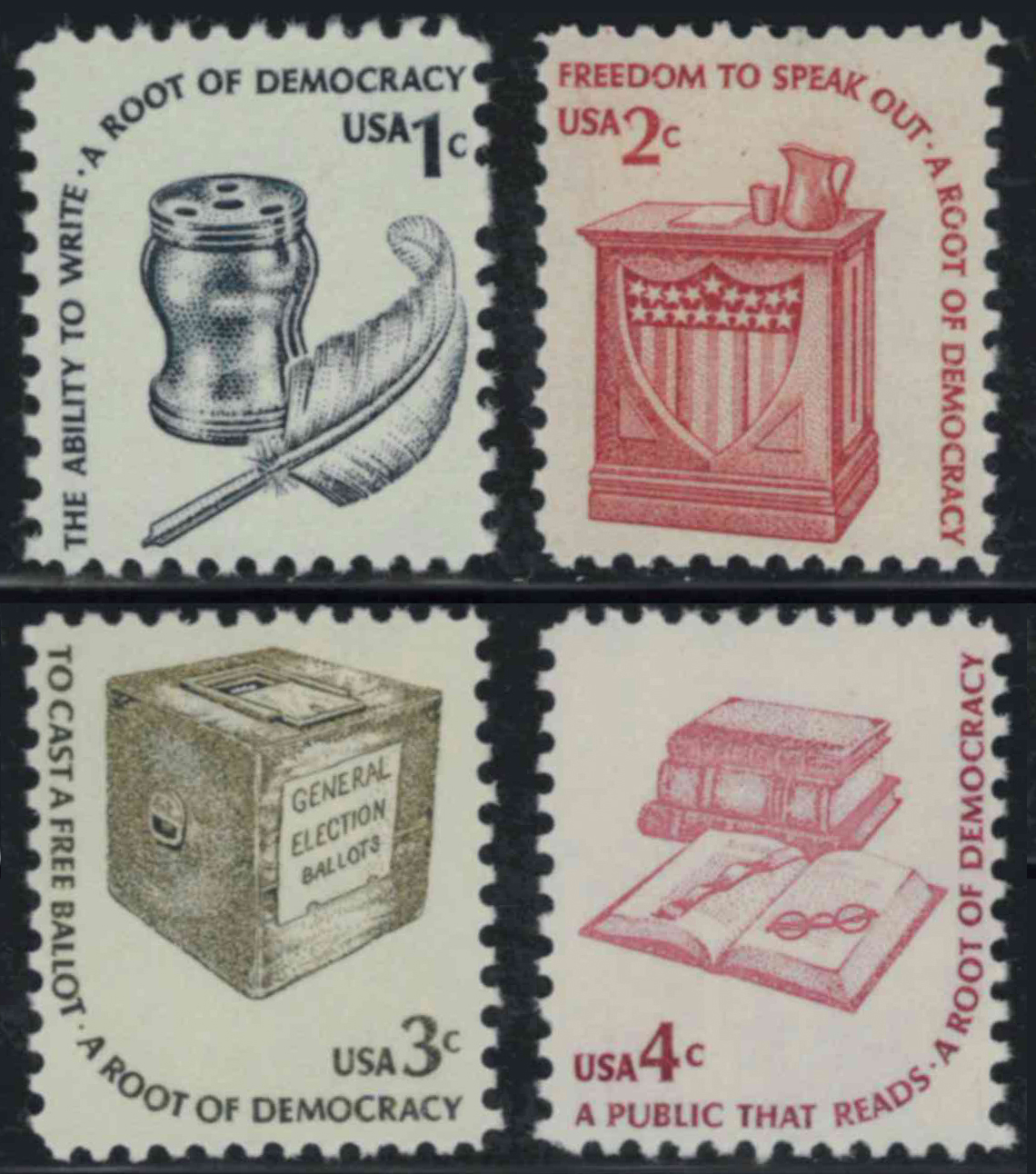
Americana Series Block 1

- 1 cent, quill pen and inkwell, "The Ability to Write * A Root of Democracy", St. Louis MO, Dec. 8, 1977
- 2 cent, speaker's stand, "Freedom To Speak Out * A Root of Democracy", St. Louis MO, Dec. 8, 1977
- 3 cent, ballot box, "To Cast A Free Ballot * A Root of Democracy", St. Louis MO, Dec. 8, 1977
- 4 cent, books and eyeglasses, "A Public That Reads * A Root of Democracy", St. Louis MO, Dec. 8, 1977

=== Rights and Freedoms of the American People ===
- 9 cent, (gray paper) Capitol dome, "Right of People Peaceably to Assemble", Washington DC, Nov. 24, 1975
- 10 cent, head of statue of Justice, "People's Right To Petition For Redress", New York NY, Nov. 17, 1977
- 11 cent, early printing press, "Liberty Depends on Freedom of the Press", Philadelphia PA, Nov. 13, 1975
- 12 cent, torch of Statue of Liberty, "Freedom of Conscience * An American Right", Dallas TX, Apr. 8, 1981

=== Symbols of America ===
- 13 cent, eagle and shield, "One Nation Indivisible * E Pluribus Unum", Juneau AK, Dec. 1, 1975
- 13 cent, Liberty Bell, "Proclaim Liberty Throughout the Land", Cleveland OH, Oct. 31, 1975
- 15 cent, American Flag, "The Land of the Free * The Home of the Brave", Baltimore MD, Jun. 30, 1978
- 16 cent, head of Statue of Liberty, "I Lift My Lamp Beside the Golden Door", New York NY, Mar. 31, 1978

=== Pioneer America ===
- 24 cent, Old North Church, "Midnight Ride * One if by Land, Two if by Sea", Boston MA, Nov. 14, 1975
- 28 cent, Fort Nisqually, Washington, "Remote Outpost * New Nation Building Westward", Tacoma WA, Aug. 11, 1978
- 29 cent, Sandy Hook lighthouse, "Lonely Beacon Protecting Those Upon the Sea", Atlantic City NJ, Apr. 14, 1978
- 30 cent, one room schoolhouse, "American Schools * Laying Future Foundations", Devils Lake ND, Aug. 27, 1979

=== America's Light ===
- 50 cent, Betty lamp, "America's Light Sustained by Love of Liberty", San Juan PR, Sep. 11, 1979
- $1, rush lamp, "America's Light Fueled by Truth and Reason", San Francisco CA and nationwide, Jul. 2, 1979
- $2, kerosene lamp, "America's Light Will Shine Over All the Land", New York NY, Nov. 16, 1978
- $5, lantern, "America's Light Leads Her Generations Onward", Boston MA, Aug. 23, 1979

=== Coil stamps ===
- 1 cent, quill pen and inkwell, "The Ability to Write * A Root of Democracy", New York NY, Mar. 6, 1980
- 3.1 cent, guitar, "Listen With Love to the Music of the Land", Shreveport LA, Oct. 25, 1979
- 3.5 cent, violins, "The Music of America is Freedom's Symphony", Williamsburg PA, Jun. 23, 1980
- 7.7 cent, saxhorns, "Marching in Step to the Music of the Union", New York NY, Nov. 20, 1976
- 7.9 cent, drum, "Beat the Drum for Liberty and the Spirit of 76", Miami FL, Apr. 23, 1976
- 8.4 cent, piano, "Peace Unites a Nation Like Harmony in Music", Interlochen MI, Jul. 13, 1978
- 9 cent, (gray paper) Capitol dome, "Right of People Peaceably to Assemble", Milwaukee WI, Mar. 5, 1978
- 10 cent, head of statue of Justice, "People's Right To Petition For Redress", Tampa FL, Nov. 4, 1977
- 12 cent, torch of Statue of Liberty, "Freedom of Conscience * An American Right", Dallas TX, Apr. 8, 1981
- 13 cent, Liberty Bell, "Proclaim Liberty Throughout the Land", Allentown PA, Nov. 25, 1975
- 15 cent, American Flag, "The Land of the Free * The Home of the Brave", Baltimore MD, Jun. 30, 1978
- 16 cent, head of Statue of Liberty, "I Lift My Lamp Beside the Golden Door", New York NY, Mar. 31, 1978

Stamps issued only within booklets:

- 9 cent (white paper, issued only with seven 13 cent Flag over Capitol stamps in a vending machine booklet), New York NY, Mar. 11, 1977

== See also ==
- Postage stamps and postal history of the United States

Preceded by Prominent Americans series	US Definitive postage stamps 1975 - 1981	Succeeded by Great Americans series and Transportation coils
