= Albert Ernest Forsythe =

American physician

- Born: 25 February 1897; Nassau, Bahamas
- Died: 6 May 1986 (aged 89); Newark, New Jersey
- Occupation: Physician
- Known for: Pioneer aviator
- Spouse: Francis T. Chew
- Parents: Horatio Alexander Forsyth (father); Lillian Maud Byndloss (mother)

Albert Ernest Forsythe (25 February 1897 – 6 May 1986) was a physician and pioneer aviator.

== Early life ==
Born in Nassau, Bahamas, he was the third child (second to survive infancy) born to Horatio Alexander Forsyth and Lillian Maud Byndloss. As a toddler, Forsythe moved with his family to Port Antonio, Jamaica, where his father became a prominent civil engineer.

At aged fifteen, Forsythe emigrated to the United States to study architecture at Tuskegee Institute. Forsythe continued his education at University of Illinois and finally at University of Toledo where he earned his Bachelor of Science. Forsyth then went on to medical school and graduated from McGill University Medical School in Canada.

== Aviation ==
In 1933, Forsythe and C. Alfred "Chief" Anderson were the first black pilots to make a round-trip cross-country flight from Atlantic City, New Jersey, to Los Angeles, California. They made the cross country journey in a Fairchild 24 purchased by Forsythe, which they named "The Pride of Atlantic City." The plane was not equipped with parachutes, a radio or landing lights, and they navigated using a road map. Later that same year, the two became the first black pilots to fly across an international border to Montreal, Quebec, Canada.

In 1934, Forsythe and Anderson bought a Lambert Monocoupe and christened it the "Booker T. Washington," in which they flew their South American Good Will Flight. During this tour, the duo accomplished several ground-breaking feats in the Caribbean.

== Personal life ==
Letters said to have been written by Forsythe during his historic flights were found by a woman under the porch of an Atlantic City home in 2011. The woman, Joi-Dickerson-Neal, said she rescued the letters from her grandfather George Dickerson's house. The letters had been written to her grandfather's late wife, the former Edith Holland, who, at the time they were written, was apparently romantically involved with Forsythe.

In 1945, Forsythe married Francis T. Chew, a nurse he met in Atlantic City. The couple settled the following year in Newark, New Jersey, where they remained until Forsythe's death in 1986.

After Forsythe's death, Francis spent much of her time championing her late husband's accomplishments and ensuring that various artifacts from Forsythe's historic feats would be placed in historic archives. Francis died in Newark, New Jersey in 2009.

The couple did not have children.

== Legacy ==
Forsythe and Anderson's accomplishments are memorialized at the Lambert-St. Louis International Airport's Black Americans in Flight mural. Anderson was honored in 2014 with his image on a United States 70 cents postal stamp. In New Jersey, the Dr. Albert E. Forsythe Chapter of Black Pilots of America, Incorporated proudly continues his aviation legacy.
