= List of Machin stamps =

This is a list of all the major variations of the Machin series of postage stamps in the United Kingdom. The complete list of all variations is vast and outside the scope of this encyclopedia.

Note: the colours and the colour descriptions are to be used to give an idea only, as each catalogue and website will name the colours differently.

== Pre-decimal issues ==
The first Machins were issued in 1967 and were in use until the UK changed to a decimal currency in 1971. These Machins came in two sizes, with the four higher value stamps being the largest.

1967–1969 pre-decimal series
Value	Colour	Size	Issued	Demonetised	Notes
½d	Orange brown	21 mm × 24 mm (0.83 in × 0.94 in)	5 Feb 1968	29 Feb 1972	
1d	Olive	21 mm × 24 mm (0.83 in × 0.94 in)	5 Feb 1968	29 Feb 1972	
2d	Lake brown	21 mm × 24 mm (0.83 in × 0.94 in)	5 Feb 1968	29 Feb 1972	
3d	Violet	21 mm × 24 mm (0.83 in × 0.94 in)	8 Aug 1967	29 Feb 1972	
4d	Sepia	21 mm × 24 mm (0.83 in × 0.94 in)	5 Jun 1967	29 Feb 1972	2nd Class basic rate from 16 September 1968 to 14 February 1971.
4d	Bright vermillion	21 mm × 24 mm (0.83 in × 0.94 in)	6 Jan 1969	29 Feb 1972	2nd Class basic rate from 16 September 1968 to 14 February 1971.
5d	Blue	21 mm × 24 mm (0.83 in × 0.94 in)	1 Jul 1968	29 Feb 1972	1st Class basic rate from 16 September 1968 to 14 February 1971.
6d	Purple	21 mm × 24 mm (0.83 in × 0.94 in)	5 Feb 1968	29 Feb 1972	
7d	Emerald	21 mm × 24 mm (0.83 in × 0.94 in)	1 July 1968	29 Feb 1972	The 7d, 8d and 9d stamps had the value indicator behind the bust.
8d	Vermillion	21 mm × 24 mm (0.83 in × 0.94 in)	1 July 1968	29 Feb 1972	The 7d, 8d and 9d stamps had the value indicator behind the bust.
8d	Light turquoise blue	21 mm × 24 mm (0.83 in × 0.94 in)	6 Jan 1969	29 Feb 1972	The 7d, 8d and 9d stamps had the value indicator behind the bust.
9d	Dark green	21 mm × 24 mm (0.83 in × 0.94 in)	8 Aug 1967	29 Feb 1972	The 7d, 8d and 9d stamps had the value indicator behind the bust.
10d	Drab	21 mm × 24 mm (0.83 in × 0.94 in)	1 Jul 1968	29 Feb 1972	The background of the 10d and 1/- stamps had a gradient.
1/-	Pale violet	21 mm × 24 mm (0.83 in × 0.94 in)	5 Jun 1967	29 Feb 1972	The background of the 10d and 1/- stamps had a gradient.
1/6	Blue and deep blue	21 mm × 24 mm (0.83 in × 0.94 in)	8 Aug 1967	29 Feb 1972	
1/9	Orange and black	21 mm × 24 mm (0.83 in × 0.94 in)	5 Jun 1967	29 Feb 1972	
2/6	Peat brown	30 mm × 35 mm (1.2 in × 1.4 in)	5 Mar 1969	29 Feb 1972	
5/-	Raspberry red	30 mm × 35 mm (1.2 in × 1.4 in)	5 Mar 1969	29 Feb 1972	
10/-	Sapphire blue	30 mm × 35 mm (1.2 in × 1.4 in)	5 Mar 1969	29 Feb 1972	
£1	Blue/black	30 mm × 35 mm (1.2 in × 1.4 in)	5 Mar 1969	31 Jul 2023	Upon demonetisation, the £1 blue/black will be the oldest-circulating Machin stamp, at 54 years and 148 days.

== Decimal issues ==
Machins continued being issued after Britain's change to decimalisation, and were produced until the end of the queen's reign. During the 1970s and 1980s, Royal Mail issued 12 Machins in a larger format. Other major variations include:

Elliptical perforation: In 1993 Royal Mail started issuing Machins with two large elliptical perforations, one on either side, as a security feature. Some Machins have both standard and elliptical perfs, but those issued after 1993 only have the ellipticals.
EME Images: In 1997 a new profile of the Queen was used on Machins. EME (or electro-mechanically engraved) images are created by computer and therefore offer better detail in the image.
Regional issues: These Machins were issued with a heraldic symbol in the top left-hand corner. These represent the Isle of Man with the Three Legs of Man symbol; Northern Ireland with the Red Hand of Ulster symbol; Scotland with the Lion of Scotland symbol and Wales with the Welsh Dragon symbol.

=== Small size (21 mm × 24 mm (0.83 in × 0.94 in)) ===
Value and colour	Date 1st issue	Elliptical perf.	EME image	Regional issue
1/2p turquoise	15 Feb 1971			
1p crimson	15 Feb 1971	8 Jun 1993	1 Apr 1997	
1 1/2p charcoal grey	15 Feb 1971			
2p deep grey-green	15 Feb 1971	11 Apr 1995	27 May 1997	
2 1/2p pale magenta	15 Feb 1971			7 Jul 1971 (Isle of Man) (Northern Ireland) (Scotland) (Wales)
2 1/2p rose madder	14 Jan 1981			
3p ultramarine	15 Feb 1971			7 Jul 1971 (Isle of Man) (Northern Ireland) (Scotland) (Wales)
3p rose red	22 Oct 1980			
3p shocking pink	10 Oct 1989			
3 1/2p grey green	15 Feb 1971			23 Jan 1974 (Northern Ireland) (Scotland) (Wales)
3 1/2p purple-brown	30 Mar 1983			
4p rust brown	15 Feb 1971			
4p turquoise	30 Jan 1980			
4p cobalt blue	26 Jan 1988	14 Dec 1993	27 May 1997	
4 1/2p blue-grey	24 Oct 1973			
4 1/2p steel blue	6 Nov 1974			6 Nov 1974 (Northern Ireland) (Scotland) (Wales)
5p grey-violet	15 Feb 1971			7 Jul 1971 (Isle of Man) (Northern Ireland) (Scotland) (Wales)
5p greyish rose	27 Jan 1982			
5p ash pink (red-brown)	26 Jul 1988	8 Jun 1993	27 May 1997	
5 1/2p deep violet	24 Oct 1973			23 Jan 1974 (Northern Ireland) (Scotland) (Wales)
6p pastel green	15 Feb 1971			
6p lime green	10 Sep 1991	27 Apr 1993	1 Apr 1997	
6 1/2p cerulean blue	4 Sep 1974			14 Jan 1976 (Northern Ireland) (Scotland) (Wales)
7p reddish brown	15 Jan 1975			18 Jan 1978 (Northern Ireland) (Scotland) (Wales)
7p brick red	29 Oct 1985			
7p light grey		20 Apr 1999		
7p shocking pink		1 Apr 2004		
7 1/2p pale chestnut	15 Feb 1971			7 Jul 1971 (Isle of Man) (Northern Ireland) (Scotland) (Wales)
8p blood red	24 Oct 1973			23 Jan 1974 (Northern Ireland) (Scotland) (Wales)
8p old gold		25 Apr 2000		
8 1/2p apple green	24 Sep 1975			14 Jan 1976 (Northern Ireland) (Scotland) (Wales)
9p orange & black	15 Feb 1971			
9p bluish violet	25 Feb 1976			18 Jan 1978 (Northern Ireland) (Scotland) (Wales)
9p orange		5 Apr 2005	1 Apr 2008	
9 1/2p deep lilac	25 Feb 1976			
10p terracotta & orange-brown	11 Aug 1971			
10p grey-orange	25 Feb 1976			20 Oct 1976 (Northern Ireland) (Scotland) (Wales)
10p light tan	4 Sep 1990	8 Jun 1993	27 May 1997	
10 1/2p light yellow	25 Feb 1976			
10 1/2p greyish blue	26 Apr 1978			18 Jan 1978 (Northern Ireland) (Scotland) (Wales)
11p pastel red	25 Feb 1976			20 Oct 1976 (Northern Ireland) (Scotland) (Wales)
11 1/2p rust brown	15 Aug 1979			
11 1/2p mushroom	14 Jan 1981			8 Apr 1981 (Northern Ireland) (Scotland) (Wales)
12p yellow-green	30 Jan 1980			23 Jul 1980 (Northern Ireland) (Scotland) (Wales)
12p emerald green	29 Oct 1985			7 Jan 1986 (Northern Ireland) (Scotland) (Wales)
12p dark turquoise		1 Aug 2006		
12 1/2p pastel green	27 Jan 1982			24 Feb 1982 (Northern Ireland) (Scotland) (Wales)
13p grey green	15 Aug 1979			
13p light brown	28 Aug 1984			23 Oct 1984 (Northern Ireland) (Scotland) (Wales)
13 1/2p red brown	30 Jan 1980			23 Jul 1980 (Northern Ireland) (Scotland) (Wales)
14p greyish blue	14 Jan 1981			8 Apr 1981 (Northern Ireland) (Scotland) (Wales)
14p dark blue	23 Aug 1988			8 Nov 1988 (Northern Ireland) (Scotland) (Wales)
14p salmon pink		1 Aug 2006		
15p ultramarine	15 Aug 1979			23 Jul 1980 (Northern Ireland) (Scotland) (Wales)
15p light blue	26 Sep 1989			28 Nov 1989 (Northern Ireland) (Scotland) (Wales)
15p shocking pink		1 Apr 2008	1 Apr 2008	
15 1/2p light violet	14 Jan 1981			24 Feb 1982 (Northern Ireland) (Scotland) (Wales)
16p light mushroom	30 Mar 1983			27 Apr 1983 (Northern Ireland) (Scotland) (Wales)
16p pink		27 Mar 2007		
16 1/2p light brown	27 Jan 1982			
17p pastel green	30 Jan 1980			
17p greyish blue	30 Mar 1983			23 Oct 1984 (Northern Ireland) (Scotland) (Wales)
17p dark blue	4 Sep 1990			4 Dec 1990 (Northern Ireland) (Scotland) (Wales)
17p olive green		31 Mar 2009		
17 1/2p chestnut brown	30 Jan 1980			
18p bluish violet	14 Jan 1981			8 Apr 1981 (Northern Ireland) (Scotland) (Wales)
18p grey green	28 Aug 1984			6 Jan 1987 (Northern Ireland) (Scotland) (Wales)
18p light green	10 Sep 1991			3 Dec 1991 (Northern Ireland) (Scotland) (Wales)
19p flame	23 Aug 1988			8 Nov 1988 (Northern Ireland) (Scotland) (Wales)
19p olive green		26 Oct 1993	20 Apr 1999	7 Dec 1993 (Northern Ireland) (Scotland) (Wales)
19 1/2p pale olive grey	27 Jan 1982			24 Feb 1982 (Northern Ireland) (Scotland) (Wales)
20p purple-grey	25 Feb 1976			
20p sea green	23 Aug 1988	7 Dec 1993		
20p black	26 Sep 1989			28 Nov 1989 (Northern Ireland) (Scotland) (Wales)
20p light green		25 Jun 1996	29 Apr 1997	23 Jul 1996 (Northern Ireland) (Scotland) (Wales)
20 1/2p ultramarine	30 Mar 1983			27 Apr 1983 (Northern Ireland) (Scotland) (Wales)
22p deep blue	22 Oct 1980			8 Apr 1981 (Northern Ireland) (Scotland) (Wales)
22p moss green	28 Aug 1984			23 Oct 1984 (Northern Ireland) (Scotland) (Wales)
22p flame	4 Sep 1990			4 Dec 1990 (Northern Ireland) (Scotland) (Wales)
22p stone		31 Mar 2009		
23p pastel red	30 Mar 1983			
23p light green	23 Aug 1988			8 Nov 1988 (Northern Ireland) (Scotland) (Wales)
24p violet	28 Aug 1984			
24p terracotta	26 Sep 1989			28 Nov 1989 (Northern Ireland) (Scotland) (Wales)
24p rust	10 Sep 1991			3 Dec 1991 (Northern Ireland) (Scotland) (Wales)
25p lilac	14 Jan 1981			
25p salmon pink		26 Oct 1993		7 Dec 1993 (Northern Ireland) (Scotland) (Wales)
26p post office red	27 Jan 1982			24 Feb 1982 (Northern Ireland) (Scotland) (Wales)
26p stone	4 Sep 1990			4 Dec 1990 (Northern Ireland) (Scotland) (Wales)
26p rust		25 Jun 1996	23 Sep 1997	23 Jul 1996 (Northern Ireland) (Scotland) (Wales)
26p gold		21 Apr 1997	21 Apr 1997	
27p rust	23 Aug 1988			
27p mauve	4 Sep 1990			
28p bluish violet	30 Mar 1983			27 Apr 1983 (Northern Ireland) (Scotland) (Wales)
28p sand	23 Aug 1988			
28p slate blue	10 Sep 1991			3 Dec 1991 (Northern Ireland) (Scotland) (Wales)
29p yellow-brown	27 Jan 1982			
29p purple	26 Sep 1989			
29p light grey		26 Oct 1993		
30p sage green	26 Sep 1989	27 Jul 1993	1997	7 Dec 1993 (Northern Ireland) (Scotland) (Wales)
31p deep lilac	30 Mar 1983			23 Oct 1984 (Northern Ireland) (Scotland) (Wales)
31p ultramarine	4 Sep 1990			
31p purple		25 Jun 1996	26 Aug 1997	
32p dark turquoise	23 Aug 1988			8 Nov 1988 (Northern Ireland) (Scotland) (Wales)
33p emerald green	4 Sep 1990			
33p slate blue		25 Apr 2000		
34p yellow brown	28 Aug 1984			
34p slate blue	26 Sep 1989			28 Nov 1989 (Northern Ireland) (Scotland) (Wales)
34p purple	10 Sep 1991			
34p lime green		6 May 2003	6 May 2003	
35p dark brown	23 Aug 1988	1 Apr 2004		
35p old gold	10 Sep 1991	17 Aug 1993		
35p lime green		5 Apr 2005	5 Apr 2005	
36p ultramarine		26 Oct 1993		
37p red	26 Sep 1989			4 Dec 1990 (Northern Ireland) (Scotland) (Wales)
37p amethyst		25 Jun 1996	26 Aug 1997	23 Jul 1996 (Northern Ireland) (Scotland) (Wales)
37p charcoal black		4 Jul 2002	4 Jul 2002	
37p olive green		28 Mar 2006	28 Mar 2006	
38p red		26 Oct 1993		
38p ultramarine		20 Apr 1999	20 Apr 1999	8 Jun 1999 (Northern Ireland)
39p amethyst	10 Sep 1991			3 Dec 1991 (Northern Ireland) (Scotland) (Wales)
39p shocking pink		25 Jun 1996	1997	
39p light grey		1 Apr 2004		
40p grey blue		25 Apr 2000	25 Apr 2000	25 Apr 2000 (Northern Ireland)
40p dark turquoise		1 Apr 2004	1 Apr 2004	
41p stone		26 Oct 1993		7 Dec 1993 (Northern Ireland) (Scotland) (Wales)
41p red		25 Apr 2000	25 Apr 2000	
42p sage green		4 Jul 2002	4 Jul 2002	
43p dark brown		25 Jun 1996	1 Apr 1997	
43p emerald green		1 Apr 2004	1 Apr 2004	
44p stone		20 Apr 1999	20 Apr 1999	
44p ultramarine		28 Mar 2006	28 Mar 2006	
45p amethyst		25 Apr 2000	25 Apr 2000	
46p old gold		5 Apr 2005	5 Apr 2005	
47p sea green		4 Jul 2002	4 Jul 2002	
48p amethyst		27 Mar 2007	27 Mar 2007	
49p rust		28 Mar 2006	28 Mar 2006	
50p ochre	2 Feb 1977			
50p sand	13 Mar 1990	14 Dec 1993	1 Apr 1997	
50p light grey		27 Mar 2007	27 Mar 2007	
50p slate grey	3 Jan 2013			
54p rust		27 Mar 2007	27 Mar 2007	
56p sage green		1 Apr 2008	1 Apr 2008	
60p slate blue		9 Aug 1994		
60p emerald green				
62p red		31 Mar 2009		
63p emerald green		25 Jun 1996	26 Aug 1997	23 Jul 1996 (Northern Ireland) (Scotland) (Wales)
64p sea green		20 Apr 1999	20 Apr 1999	8 Jun 1999 (Northern Ireland)
65p dark turquoise		25 Apr 2000	25 Apr 2000	25 Apr 2000 (Northern Ireland)
68p stone		4 Jul 2002	4 Jul 2002	
72p red		28 Mar 2006	28 Mar 2006	
75p India black	30 Jan 1980			
78p emerald green		27 Mar 2007	27 Mar 2007	
81p turquoise		1 Apr 2008	1 Apr 2008	
81p holly green	26 Mar 2014			
87p orange	25 Apr 2012			
88p shocking pink	30 Mar 2010			
88p amber yellow	27 Mar 2013			
90p ultramarine	31 Mar 2009			
97p mauve	31 Mar 2009			
97p purple heather	26 Mar 2014			
£1 mauve		22 Aug 1995	1 Apr 1997	
£1 ruby		5 Jun 2007	5 Jun 2007	
£1 wood brown	3 Jan 2013			
£1.05 gooseberry green	22 Mar 2016			
£1.10 lime green	29 Mar 2011			
£1.17 sunrise red	21 Mar 2017			
£1.25 holly green	20 Mar 2018			
£1.28 emerald green	25 Apr 2012			
£1.33 amber yellow	24 Mar 2015			
£1.35 orchid mauve	19 Mar 2019			
£1.40 dark pine green	12 Mar 2017			
£1.42 garnet red	17 Mar 2020			
£1.45 dove grey	26 Mar 2014			
£1.46 dark turquoise	30 Mar 2010			
£1.47 dove grey	26 Mar 2014			
£1.50 brownish red		9 Mar 1999		
£1.52 orchid mauve	24 Mar 2015			
£1.55 marine turquoise	20 Mar 2018			
£1.57 tarragon pine green	21 Mar 2017			
£1.60 amber yellow	21 Mar 2017			
£1.63 sunset red	13 Mar 2020			
£1.65 sage green	29 Mar 2011			
£1.68 tarragon green	17 Mar 2020			
£1.70 marine turquoise	23 Dec 2020			
£1.88 sapphire blue	27 Mar 2013			
£1.90 amethyst	25 Apr 2012			
£2 slate blue		9 Mar 1999		
£2.15 marine turquoise	26 Mar 2014			
£2.25 plum purple	24 Mar 2015			
£2.27 harvest gold	21 Mar 2017			
£2.30 gooseberry green	19 Mar 2019			
£2.42 purple heather	17 Mar 2020			
£2.45 spruce green	24 Mar 2015			
£2.55 garnet red	21 Mar 2017			
£2.65 purple heather	20 Mar 2018			
£2.80 spruce green	19 Mar 2019			
£2.97 rose pink	17 Mar 2020			
£3 dull purple		9 Mar 1999		
£3 purple	3 Jul 2003			
£3.15 aqua green	24 Mar 2015			
£3.25 aqua green	23 Dec 2020			
£3.30 rose pink	24 Mar 2015			
£3.45 dark pine green	19 Mar 2019			
£3.60 bright orange	19 Mar 2020			
£3.66 harvest gold	17 Mar 2020			
£3.82 holly green	17 Mar 2020			
£4.20 plum purple	23 Dec 2020			
£5 brown		9 Mar 1999		
£5 grey blue		1 Jul 2003		

=== Large size (30 mm × 35 mm (1.2 in × 1.4 in)) ===
Value and colour	Date 1st issue
10p cerise	Jun 17 1970
20p olive green	Jun 17 1970
50p deep ultramarine	Jun 17 1970
£1 bluish black	Jun 17 1970
£1 olive & greenish yellow	Feb 2 1977
£1.30 buff & blue-green	Aug 3 1983
£1.33 mauve & blue-black	Aug 28 1984
£1.41 buff & blue-green	Sep 17 1985
£1.50 blue-black & lilac	Sep 2 1986
£1.60 blue-black & buff	Sep 15 1987
£2 purple-brown and pale green	Feb 2 1977
£5 royal blue & pale pink	Feb 2 1977

== NVI (non-value indicator) issues ==
NVI (or non-value indicator) Machins first appeared in 1989 in an attempt to negate the need to keep issuing new stamps after each postal rate change. They are marked 1st and 2nd for the two classes of post in the United Kingdom. The E NVI stamp represented the standard letter rate to Europe.

=== Small size (21 mm × 24 mm (0.83 in × 0.94 in)) ===
Value and colour	Date 1st issue	Elliptical perf.	EME image	Regional issue
1st black	Aug 22 1989			
1st flame	Aug 7 1990	Apr 6 1993	Apr 29 1997	Feb 15 2000 (Northern Ireland) (Scotland) (Wales)
1st gold		Apr 21 1997	Apr 21 1997	
1st Millennium white		Jan 6 2000	Jan 6 2000	
1st gold (large value)		Aug 1 2006	Aug 1 2006	
2nd light blue	Aug 22 1989	Apr 6 1993	Apr 29 1997	
2nd dark blue	Aug 7 1990			
2nd light blue (large value)		Aug 1 2006	Aug 1 2006	
E dark blue		Jan 19 1999	Jan 19 1999	

=== Horizontal issues ===
Value and colour	Date 1st issue	Elliptical perf.	EME image
1st gold (large value)		Aug 1 2006	Aug 1 2006
2nd light blue (large value)		Aug 1 2006	Aug 1 2006

=== Large size (30 mm × 35 mm (1.2 in × 1.4 in)) ===
Value and colour	Date 1st issue
1st embossed	Feb 16 1999
1st engraved	Feb 16 1999
1st typographed	Feb 16 1999

== Penny Black anniversary issues ==
In 1990, the Royal Mail issued five stamps to commemorate the 150th anniversary of the Penny Black. They featured the Machin image of Queen Elizabeth II overlaying the image of Queen Victoria from the Penny Black. An NVI issue was released in 2000.

=== Small size (21 mm × 24 mm (0.83 in × 0.94 in)) ===
Value and colour	Date 1st issue
15p light blue	Jan 10 1990
20p black & cream	Jan 10 1990
20p black	Apr 17 1990
29p purple	Jan 10 1990
34p slate blue	Jan 10 1990
37p red	Jan 10 1990
1st black	Feb 15 2000

== Airmail issues ==
=== Small size (21 mm × 24 mm (0.83 in × 0.94 in)) ===
Value & Colour	Date 1st Issue
Airmail Europe up to 20g	30 Mar 2003
Airmail Europe up to 40g	27 Mar 2003
Airmail Worldwide up to 20g	30 Mar 2003
Airmail Worldwide up to 40g	27 Mar 2003
Airmail Postcard	1 Apr 2004

== Self-adhesive stamps ==
Since about 2009, virtually all Machins have been issued only as self-adhesive stamps. The primary exceptions have been stamps issued as part of Prestige Stamp Booklets or in souvenir sheets.

== Barcoded series (2021–present) ==
Machin stamps with Data Matrix barcodes were introduced in two stages, on 1 February 2022 (non-value indicators), and 4 April 2022 (other values). All barcoded stamps are self-adhesive.

Existing definitive stamps issued from 15 February 1971 to 31 January 2022 remain valid until 31 January 2023: since 31 March 2022, they can be indefinitely exchanged for the barcoded series.

The 2022 issue was the last release in the Machin series prior to the death of Elizabeth II. On 8 February 2023, the design for the new definitive series, to be released on 4 April 2023 and featuring a portrait of Charles III by Martin Jennings, was revealed.

=== 2021 barcoded trial ===
2022 barcoded trial
Type	Value	Colour	Size	First issued
NVI	2nd	Light blue	39 mm × 30 mm (1.5 in × 1.2 in)	23 March 2021

=== 2022 barcoded issues ===
2022 barcoded series
Type	Value	Colour	Size	First issued
NVI	1st	Plum purple	39 mm × 30 mm (1.5 in × 1.2 in)	1 February 2022
NVI	2nd	Holly green	39 mm × 30 mm (1.5 in × 1.2 in)	1 February 2022
NVI Large	1st	Marine turquoise	39 mm × 30 mm (1.5 in × 1.2 in)	1 February 2022
NVI Large	2nd	Dark pine green	39 mm × 30 mm (1.5 in × 1.2 in)	1 February 2022
Low Value (Note: Royal Mail also refers to barcoded Low and High Value stamps as "Make up Value stamps".)	1p	Sapphire blue on white	39 mm × 30 mm (1.5 in × 1.2 in)	4 April 2022
Low Value	2p	Dark green on white	39 mm × 30 mm (1.5 in × 1.2 in)	4 April 2022
Low Value	5p	Purple heather on white	39 mm × 30 mm (1.5 in × 1.2 in)	4 April 2022
Low Value	10p	Aqua green on white	39 mm × 30 mm (1.5 in × 1.2 in)	4 April 2022
Low Value	20p	Light green on white	39 mm × 30 mm (1.5 in × 1.2 in)	4 April 2022
Low Value	50p	Slate grey on white	39 mm × 30 mm (1.5 in × 1.2 in)	4 April 2022
Low Value	£1	Wood brown on white	39 mm × 30 mm (1.5 in × 1.2 in)	4 April 2022
High Value	£2	Bright blue on white	39 mm × 30 mm (1.5 in × 1.2 in)	4 April 2022
High Value	£3	Purple on white	39 mm × 30 mm (1.5 in × 1.2 in)	4 April 2022
High Value	£5	Spruce green on white	39 mm × 30 mm (1.5 in × 1.2 in)	4 April 2022
International	£1.85	Wood brown	39 mm × 30 mm (1.5 in × 1.2 in)	4 April 2022
International	£2.55	Sapphire blue	39 mm × 30 mm (1.5 in × 1.2 in)	4 April 2022
International	£3.25	Purple	39 mm × 30 mm (1.5 in × 1.2 in)	4 April 2022
International	£4.20	Light green	39 mm × 30 mm (1.5 in × 1.2 in)	4 April 2022
