= Liberty Issue =

Series of US postage stamps

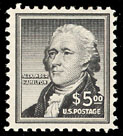
A $5 stamp depicting Alexander Hamilton, the highest denomination in the Liberty issue

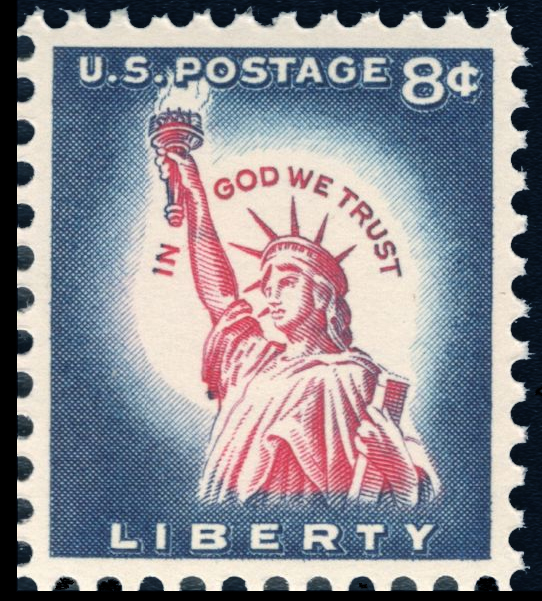
An 8¢ Liberty stamp, redrawn Giori Press version with lower flame

The Liberty issue was a definitive series of postage stamps issued by the United States between 1954 and 1965. It offered twenty-four denominations, ranging from a half-cent issue showing Benjamin Franklin to a five dollar issue depicting Alexander Hamilton. However, in a notable departure from all definitive series since 1870, the stamp for a normal first-class letter—the 3-cent value—did not present the portrait of a president, but instead offered a monocolor image of the Statue of Liberty. Moreover, two-color renderings of the Statue of Liberty (Liberty Enlightening the World) appeared on both the 8 cent and 11 cent stamps; and it is from these three denominations that the Liberty issue takes its name. (Oversized versions of the 3¢ and 8¢ stamps also appeared on a miniature sheet issued in 1956 for the Fifth International Philatelic exhibition.) Pictures of other national landmarks, such as Bunker Hill and Mount Vernon, are found on several values, while the rest of the stamps follow tradition, containing portraits of well-known historic Americans. The six denominations in the set that illustrate buildings (The Alamo, Monticello, etc.) were all designed in landscape format, resulting in a free intermixture of landscape and portrait orientation for the first time in a definitive U.S. issue (in all previous mixed sets, landscape stamps had been confined to the highest denominations).

Like three previous U. S. definitive issues, the Liberty series offered one—and only one—image of a prominent woman. But while Martha Washington had played this role in the series of 1902, 1922–1925 and 1938, the Liberty Issue eliminated her, instead presenting Susan B. Anthony, portrayed on the 50-cent stamp. The Liberty Issue was the first definitive series including multiple presidents issued since 1861 which did not contain a single stamp honoring a recently deceased president. To be sure, the only president who would have qualified, Franklin D. Roosevelt, had died quite a while before—some nine years—and, moreover, was not admired by the political party that introduced the new series. FDR was the first deceased president since Chester A. Arthur (d. 1886) to have been excluded from the next multi-president definitive series to appear after his death—denied an honor that had been accorded to his eight predecessors in office: Cleveland, Harrison, McKinley, Theodore Roosevelt, Taft, Wilson, Harding and Coolidge. It is also notable that only 28% of the Liberty series stamps offered images of presidents (seven out of 25 denominations): a smaller presidential percentage than had appeared on any previous U. S. definitive issue.

Release of the Liberty series began in 1954, and the set was essentially complete by 1960, but a few values were added subsequently. While the Liberty stamps were generally replaced by the Prominent Americans series, issued starting in 1965, several of its denominations remained on sale for a considerable period of time afterwards. Most notably, two coil stamps—the 2 cent Thomas Jefferson and the 25 cent Paul Revere—were repeatedly reprinted, continuing on sale well into the 1980s. Remaining stocks of the 12 cent Benjamin Harrison stamp were sold at some post offices in 1981 to meet the new postal card rate as the United States Postal Service was not able to issue a new 12 cent stamp prior to the implementation of the rate increase.

Over the time span that the series was issued the technology of printing postage stamps changed. This led to many of the stamps having varieties with different papers, perforations and the addition of a phosphor coating. Thus at this more specialized level the series is rather complex.

The 1/2 cent stamp was the last issued of that denomination for use as postage, although a postage due stamp of that value was issued in 1959. It was also the last appearance of Franklin on a lower value stamp in a regular series, a tradition that had been followed since 1847. In this series, two of the fractional denominations—1¼¢ and 2½¢—appeared on U. S. postage stamps for the first time.

== Stamps of the Liberty issue, their first day of issue sites and dates ==
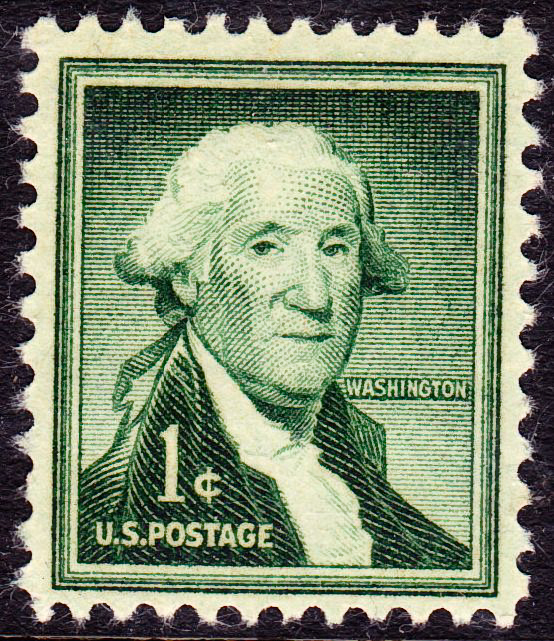

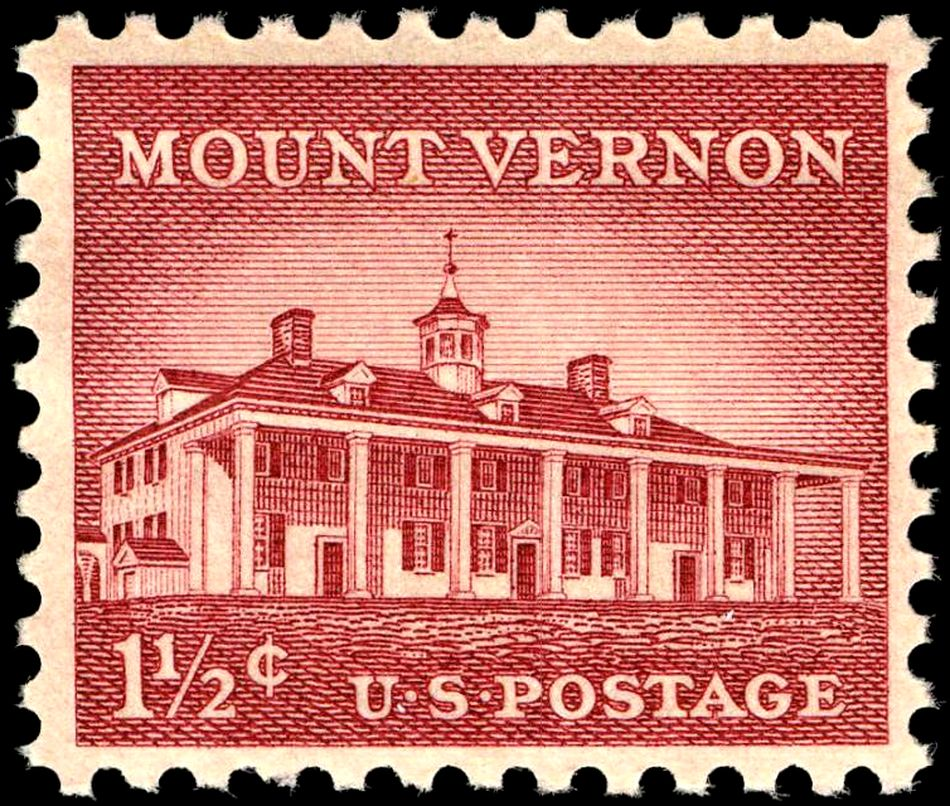

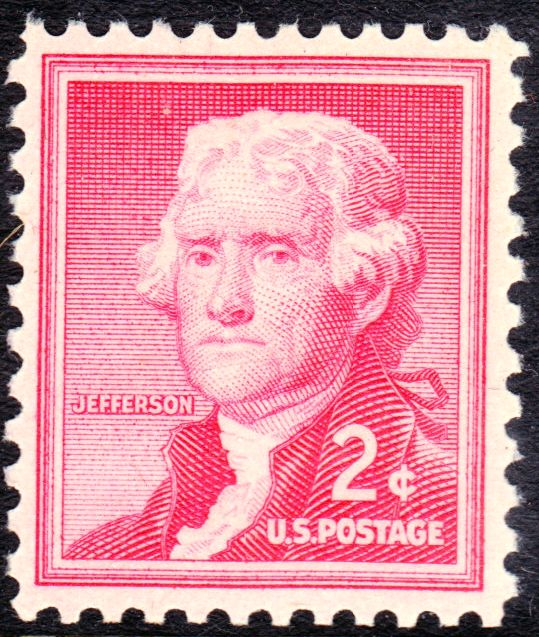

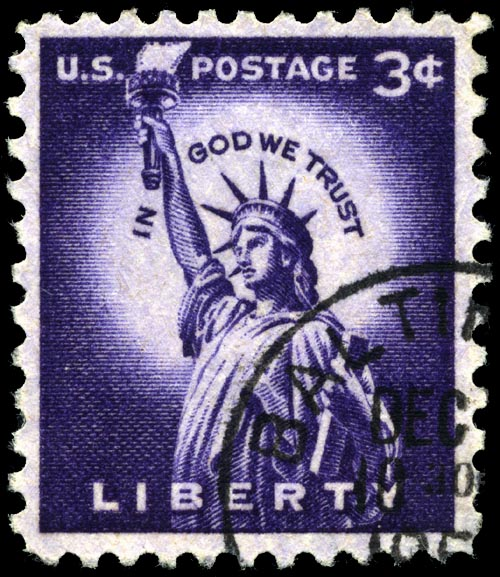

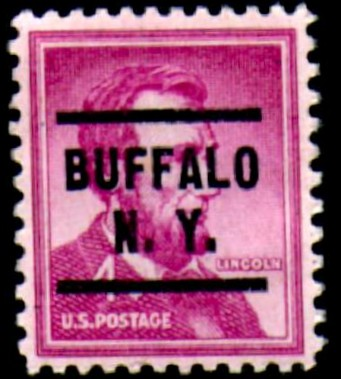

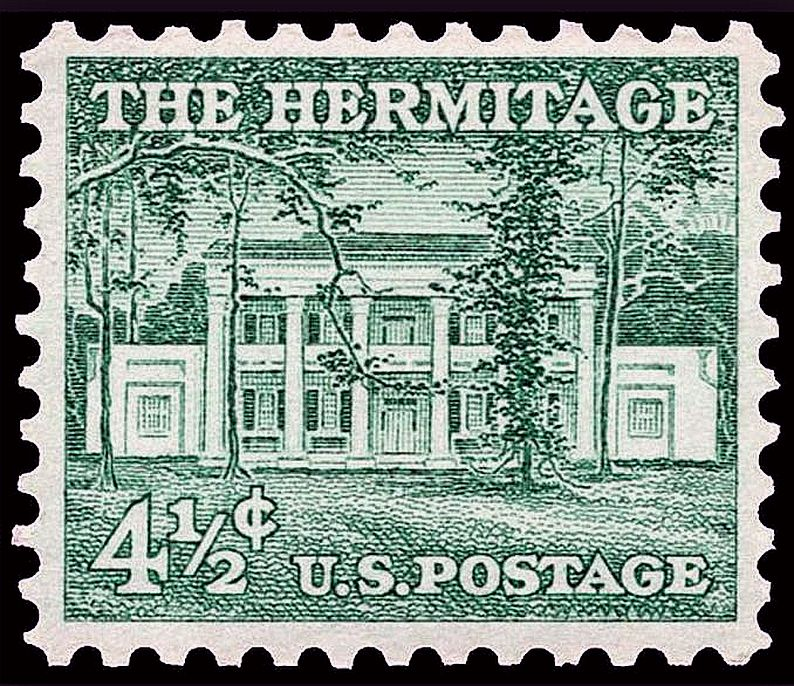

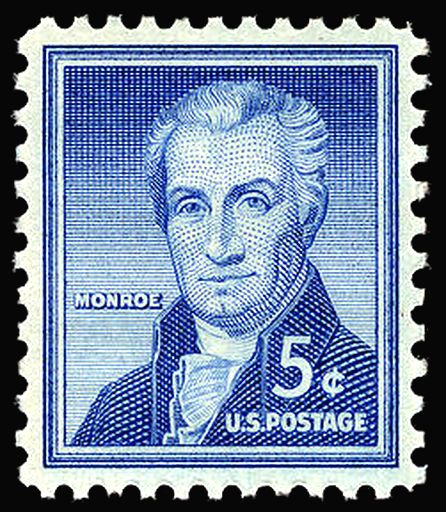

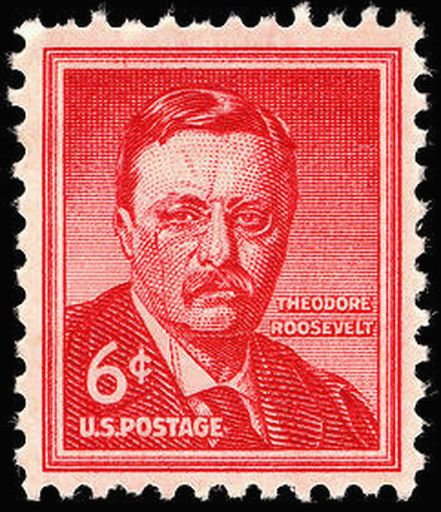

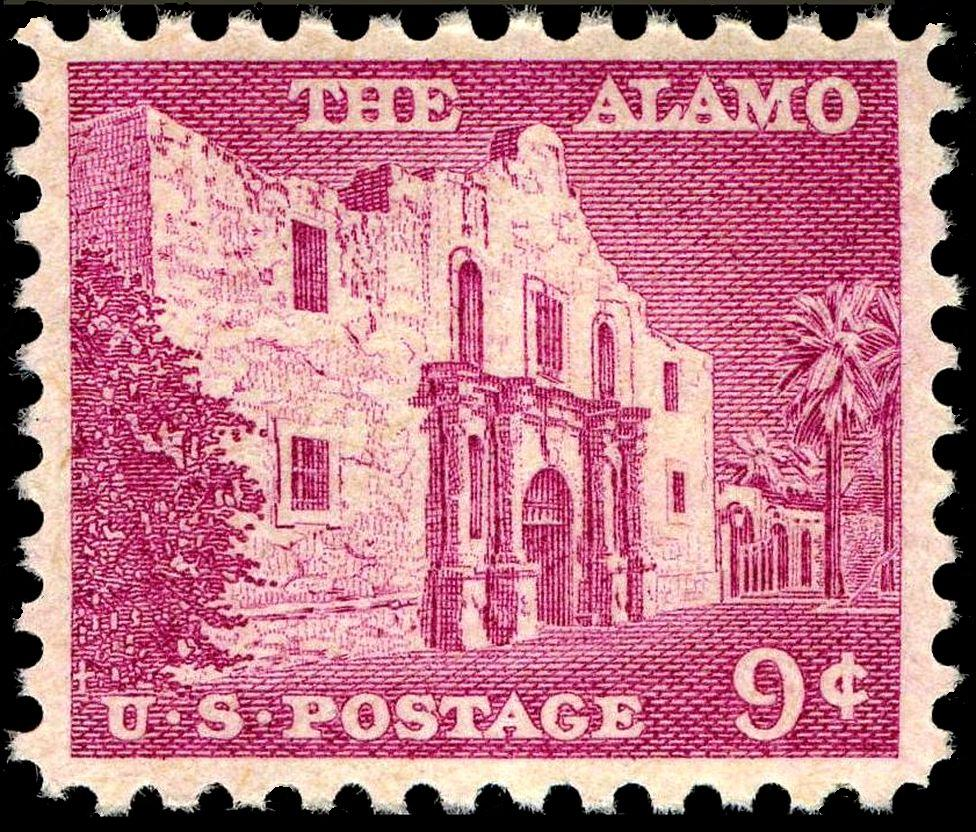

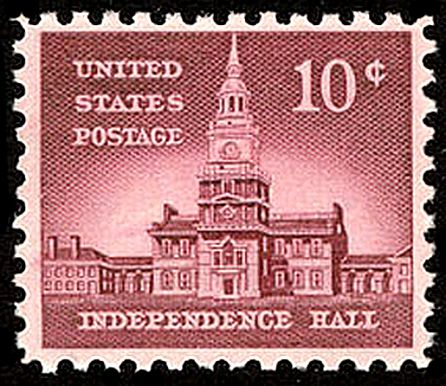

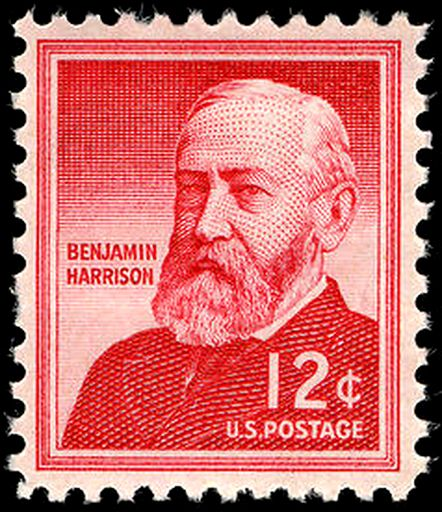

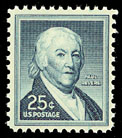

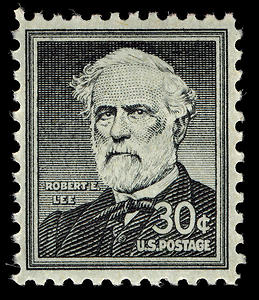

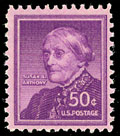

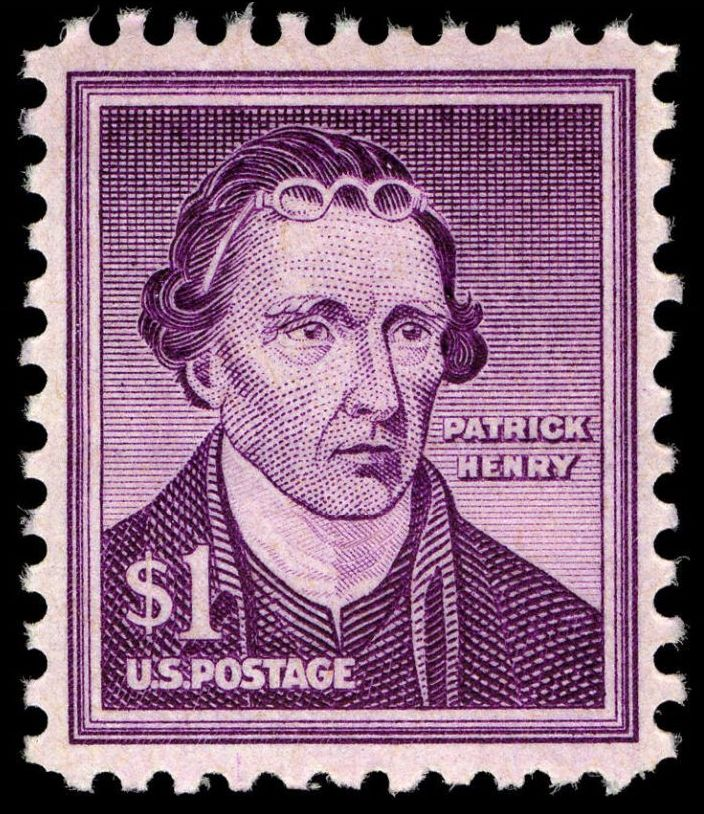

Sheet format:

- ½¢ Benjamin Franklin, Washington, D.C. - Oct. 20, 1955
- 1¢ George Washington, Chicago, IL - Aug. 26, 1954
- 1¼¢ Palace of the Governors, Santa Fe, NM - Jun. 17, 1960
- 1½¢ Mount Vernon, Mount Vernon, VA - Feb. 22, 1956
- 2¢ Thomas Jefferson, San Francisco, CA - Sep. 15, 1954
- 2½¢ Bunker Hill Monument, Boston, MA - Jun. 17, 1959
- 3¢ Statue of Liberty, Albany, NY - Jun. 24, 1954
- 4¢ Abraham Lincoln, New York, NY - Nov. 19, 1954
- 4½¢ The Hermitage, Hermitage, TN - Mar. 16, 1959
- 5¢ James Monroe, Fredericksburg, VA - Dec. 2, 1954
- 6¢ Theodore Roosevelt, New York, NY - Nov. 18, 1955
- 7¢ Woodrow Wilson, Staunton, VA - Jan. 10, 1956
- 8¢ Statue of Liberty - (Rotary Press-Flat Plate), Washington, D.C. - Apr. 9, 1954
- 8¢ Statue of Liberty - (Giori Press), Cleveland, OH - Mar. 22, 1958
- 8¢ John J. Pershing, New York, NY - Nov. 17, 1961 (Scott catalogue renumbered to be part of the Regular Issue Series of 1961–66)
- 9¢ Alamo, San Antonio, TX - Jun. 14, 1956
- 10¢ Independence Hall, Philadelphia, PA - Jul. 4, 1956
- 11¢ Statue of Liberty, Washington, D.C. - Jun. 15, 1961
- 12¢ Benjamin Harrison, Oxford, OH - Jun. 6, 1959
- 15¢ John Jay, Washington, D.C. - Dec. 12, 1958
- 20¢ Monticello, Charlottesville, VA - Apr. 13, 1956
- 25¢ Paul Revere, Boston, MA - Apr. 18, 1958
- 30¢ Robert E. Lee, Norfolk, VA - Sep. 21, 1955
- 40¢ John Marshall, Richmond, VA - Sep. 24, 1955
- 50¢ Susan B. Anthony, Louisville, KY - Aug. 25, 1955
- $1 Patrick Henry, Joplin, MO - Oct. 7, 1955
- $5 Alexander Hamilton, Paterson, NJ - Mar. 19, 1956

Coil stamps:

- 1¢ George Washington, Baltimore, MD - Oct. 8, 1954
- 1¼¢ Palace of the Governors, Santa Fe, NM - Jun. 17, 1960
- 2¢ Thomas Jefferson, St. Louis, MO - Oct. 22, 1954
- 2½¢ Bunker Hill, Los Angeles, CA - Sep. 9, 1959
- 3¢ Statue of Liberty, Washington, D.C. - Jul. 20, 1954
- 4¢ Abraham Lincoln, Mandan, ND - Jul. 31, 1958

(The 4-cent coil "WET" print (Stickney press) exists only Precanceled, and is the scarcest regularly issued "KEY" item of the entire series.)

- 4½¢ The Hermitage, Denver, CO - May 1, 1959
- 25¢ Paul Revere, Wheaton, MD - Feb. 25, 1965

== A rare variety ==
In late 1954, the Bureau of Engraving and Printing contracted with the S.D. Waren Co. to produce 50,000 stamps (125 sheets of 400 stamps subdivided into 500 panes of 100). Silkote paper, which was whiter and smoother than ordinary paper and required less moisture content was used. The intent was to evaluate if this paper would help resolve shrinkage as the paper dried after printing. These were sent to the Cumberland Mills branch of the Westbrook, Maine post office, and were placed on sale on December 17, 1954. Silkote stamps will show a much sharper and brighter image than the standard 2c issue, and although the results were positive the Bureau determined that they did not justify the added expense. It is estimated that no more than 400 of these stamps, which have been designated in the Scott catalogue as "1033a", still exist.

== See also ==
- Postage stamps and postal history of the United States

Preceded by Presidential Issue	US Definitive postage stamps 1954 - 1965	Succeeded by Prominent Americans series
