= Transportation coils =

Canoe, 5 cents, plate number S11

The Transportation coils series is a set of definitive stamps issued by the United States Postal Service between 1981 and 1995. Officially dubbed the "Transportation Issue" or "Transportation Series", they have come to be called the "transportation coils" because all of the denominations were issued in coil stamp format. All values except three were printed by the Bureau of Engraving and Printing.

The theme of the series was historical transportation vehicles used in the United States since its independence. The designs are spare, consisting only of the vehicle itself, and with inscriptions describing the general type ("Circus Wagon" or "Ferryboat") and a date, either a decade or sometimes a specific year. The stamps are primarily engraved, almost all in a single color on plain white paper (the $1 seaplane is in two colors). Some of the denominations also received special service inscriptions in black, such as "Bulk Rate" or "ZIP + 4 Presort". Many of those denominations were unusual decimal rates, such as 16.7 or 24.1 cents, used by bulk mailers and other businesses who also used precancels. Decimal rates had previously appeared on some coils of the 1975 Americana series.

Plate numbers were printed in small letters at the bottom of the stamps at intervals of twenty-four, forty-eight, or fifty-two depending on the printing press employed and these stamps are known as plate number coils. The series has become popular with stamp collectors, both because of the "classic" engraved designs, and because to the emergence of the plate number collecting. Many issues with specific plate numbers are hard to find and can be valuable.

Stamps of the series (ordered by denomination, not issue date):

- 1¢ Omnibus
- 2¢ Locomotive
- 3¢ Handcar
- 3¢ Conestoga
- 3.4¢ School Bus
- 4¢ Stagecoach
- 4¢ Steam Carriage
- 4.9¢ Buckboard
- 5¢ Motorcycle
- 5¢ Milk wagon
- 5¢ Circus wagon
- 5¢ Canoe
- 5.2¢ Sleigh
- 5.3¢ Elevator
- 5.5¢ Star Route Truck
- 5.9¢ Bicycle
- 6¢ Tricycle
- 7.1¢ Tractor
- 7.4¢ Baby Buggy
- 7.6¢ Carreta
- 8.3¢ Ambulance
- 8.4¢ Wheel Chair
- 8.5¢ Tow Truck
- 9.3¢ Mail Wagon
- 10¢ Canal Boat
- 10¢ Tractor Trailer
- 10.1¢ Oil Wagon
- 10.9¢ Hansom Cab
- 11¢ Caboose
- 11¢ Stutz Bearcat
- 12¢ Stanley Steamer
- 12.5¢ Pushcart
- 13¢ Patrol Wagon
- 13.2¢ Coal Car
- 14¢ Iceboat
- 15¢ Tugboat
- 16.7¢ Popcorn Wagon
- 17¢ Electric Auto
- 17¢ Dog Sled
- 17.5¢ Racing Car
- 18¢ Surrey
- 20¢ Fire Pumper
- 20¢ Cable Car
- 20¢ Cog Railway
- 20.5¢ Fire Engine
- 21¢ Railway Mail Car
- 23¢ Lunch Wagon
- 24.1¢ Tandem Bike
- 25¢ Bread Wagon
- 32¢ Ferry Boat
- $1 Sea Plane

== References and sources ==
Notes

Sources

- Scott catalog
