= Christmas stamp =

Stamp issued during the Christmas season

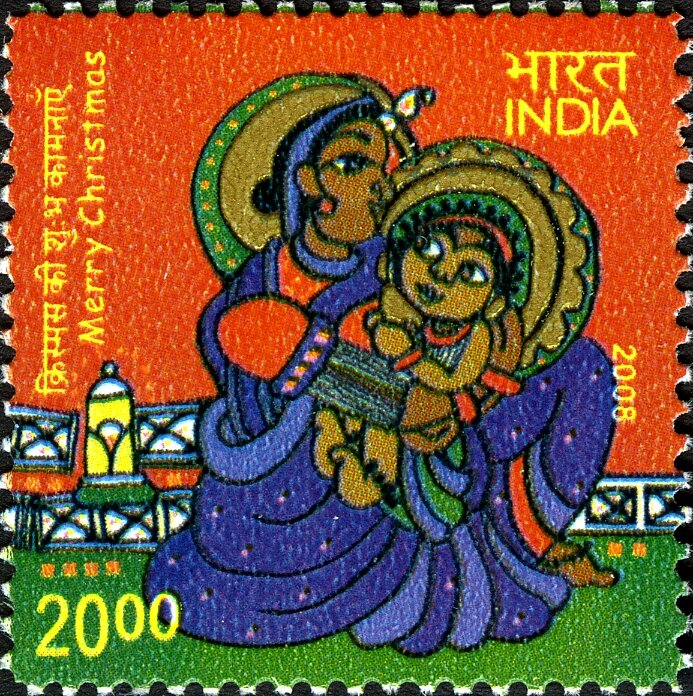
A Christmas stamp from India featuring religious imagery

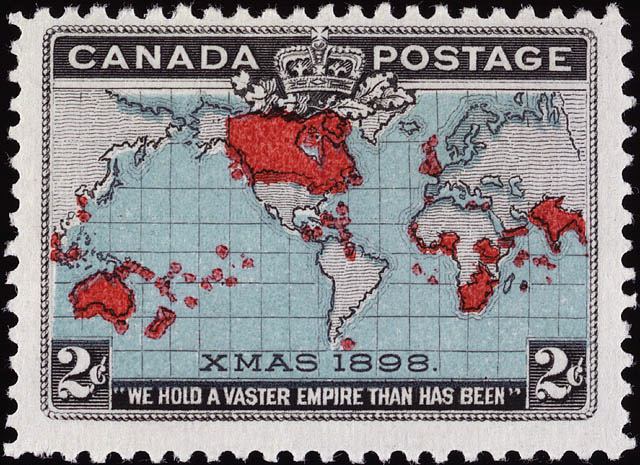
This Canadian stamp's Christmas connection is in the "XMAS 1898" at the bottom of the map.

A Christmas stamp is a postage stamp with a Christmas theme, intended for use on seasonal mail such as Christmas cards. Many countries issue such stamps, which are regular postage stamps (in contrast to Christmas seals) and are usually valid for postage year-round (in some countries they have a discounted value and are for use exclusively on Christmas cards). They usually go on sale some time between early October and early December, and are printed in considerable quantities.

== History ==
British Troops in Egypt Christmas stamp, 1935

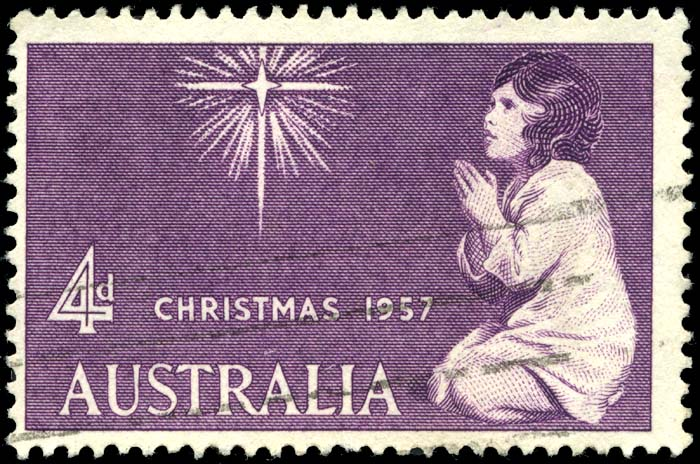
First Christmas stamp of Australia, 1957

It is a matter of some debate as to which was the first Christmas stamp. The Canadian map stamp of 1898 bears an inscription "XMAS 1898", but it was actually issued to mark the inauguration of the Imperial Penny Postage rate. The Christmas connection has long been reported to have been the result of quick thinking; William Mulock was proposing that it be issued on 9 November, to "honor the Prince" (meaning the Prince of Wales), but when Queen Victoria asked "what Prince?" in a displeased manner, Mulock realized the danger, and answered "Why, madam, the Prince of Peace."

In 1935, British Forces troops stationed in Egypt were issued with a Christmas stamp for their mail home. For many years these were not included in the Stanley Gibbons catalogues, as they classified them as a “seal” rather than a postage stamp, but they have been properly included since the mid-1960s as they prepaid postage and so, despite the inscription "Letter stamp", are normal stamps, and should therefore be counted as the first stamp issued expressly to mark Christmas. Like the slightly earlier Silver Jubilee overprints on the “sphinx” stamp, the Christmas stamps were issued in booklet form in panes of 20.

In 1937, Austria issued two "Christmas greeting stamps" featuring a rose and zodiac signs. In 1939, Brazil issued four semi-postal stamps with designs featuring the three kings and a star, an angel and child, the Southern Cross and a child, and a mother and child. In 1941 Hungary also issued a semi-postal whose additional fees were to pay for "soldiers' Christmas". The first stamps to depict the Nativity were the Hungary issue of 1943. These were all one-time issues, more like commemorative stamps than regular issues.

The next Christmas stamps did not appear until 1951, when Cuba issued designs with poinsettias and bells, followed by Haiti in 1954, Luxembourg and Spain in 1955, and Australia, South Korea, and Liechtenstein in 1957. In cases such as Australia, the issuance marked the first of what became an annual tradition. Many additional countries took up the practice during the 1960s, including the United States in 1962 and the United Kingdom in 1966.

By the 1990s, approximately 160 postal administrations were issuing Christmas stamps, mostly on an annual basis. Islamic countries constitute the largest group of non-participants, although the Palestinian Authority has issued Christmas stamps since 1995.

== Designs ==
Although some tropical islands produce large-format Christmas stamps primarily intended for sale to stamp collectors, for the rest of the world, Christmas stamps are "working stamps" that will be used in large numbers to send greeting cards and postcards. Accordingly, the stamps tend to be normal-sized, and offered in one or a few denominations, for instance to cover differing domestic and international rates.

The choice of designs is highly variable, ranging from an overtly religious image of the Nativity, to secular images of Christmas trees, wreaths, Santa Claus, and so forth. A country may maintain a unified theme for several years, then change it drastically, in some cases seemingly to follow "fashion moves" by other countries. For instance, during the 1970s many countries issued Christmas stamps featuring children's drawings, with the young artist identified by name and age.

The choice of secular or religious designs is frequently a bone of contention in some countries; church leaders often see secular designs as diluting the meaning of the holiday, while postal officials fear that overly religious designs could lead their secular or minority-religious customers to avoid the stamps, leaving millions unsold, and even expose the postal administration to charges that they are violating laws prohibiting the promotion of a particular religion.

In the United States, annual discord over "secular" versus "religious" designs was eventually resolved by the Postal Service issuing some of each per year; typically a group of 4–6 related secular designs, plus a religious design (usually depicting the Madonna and Child). To avoid difficulties attendant upon contracting for original designs with a religious theme, the latter have typically been adapted from Old Master paintings hanging in U.S. galleries, thus qualifying as depictions of art. (In 2012, 2014, and 2016, however, religious-themed stamps were issued featuring original designs depicting the flight into Egypt, the journey of the Magi, and the Nativity of Jesus, respectively.) In the United Kingdom, the Royal Mail resolves the difficulty by issuing "religious" and "secular" themed designs in alternate years.

== Gallery ==
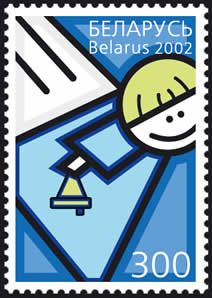
Belarus 2002, stylised angel

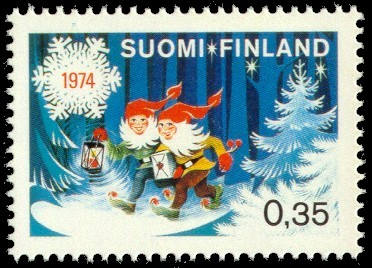
1974 Finland Christmas elves

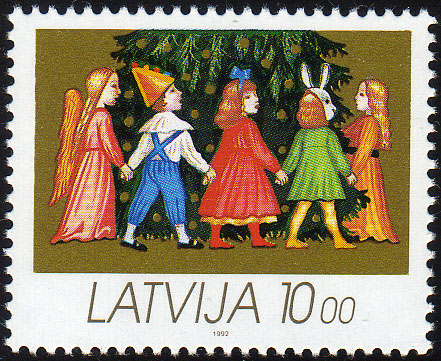
Latvia 2009

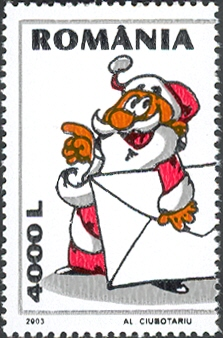
Romania 2003 featuring Santa Claus-like figure and a large envelope

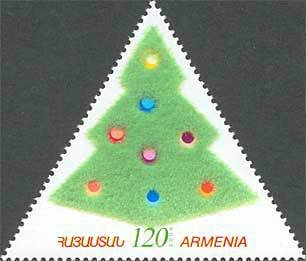
Stamps aren't always rectangular. Armenia triangular New Year stamp, featuring a Christmas tree

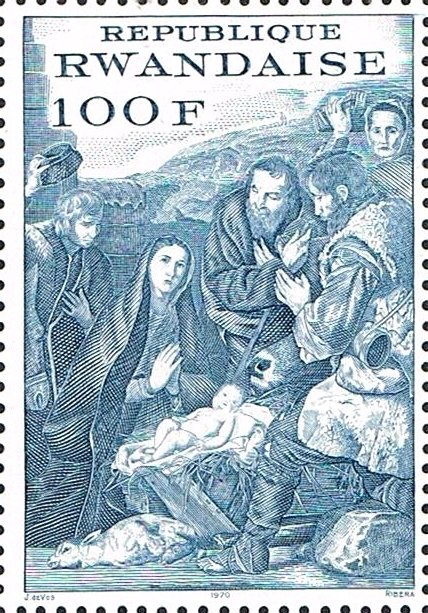
1970 Rwanda stamp featuring Adoration of the Shepherds by Jusepe de Ribera

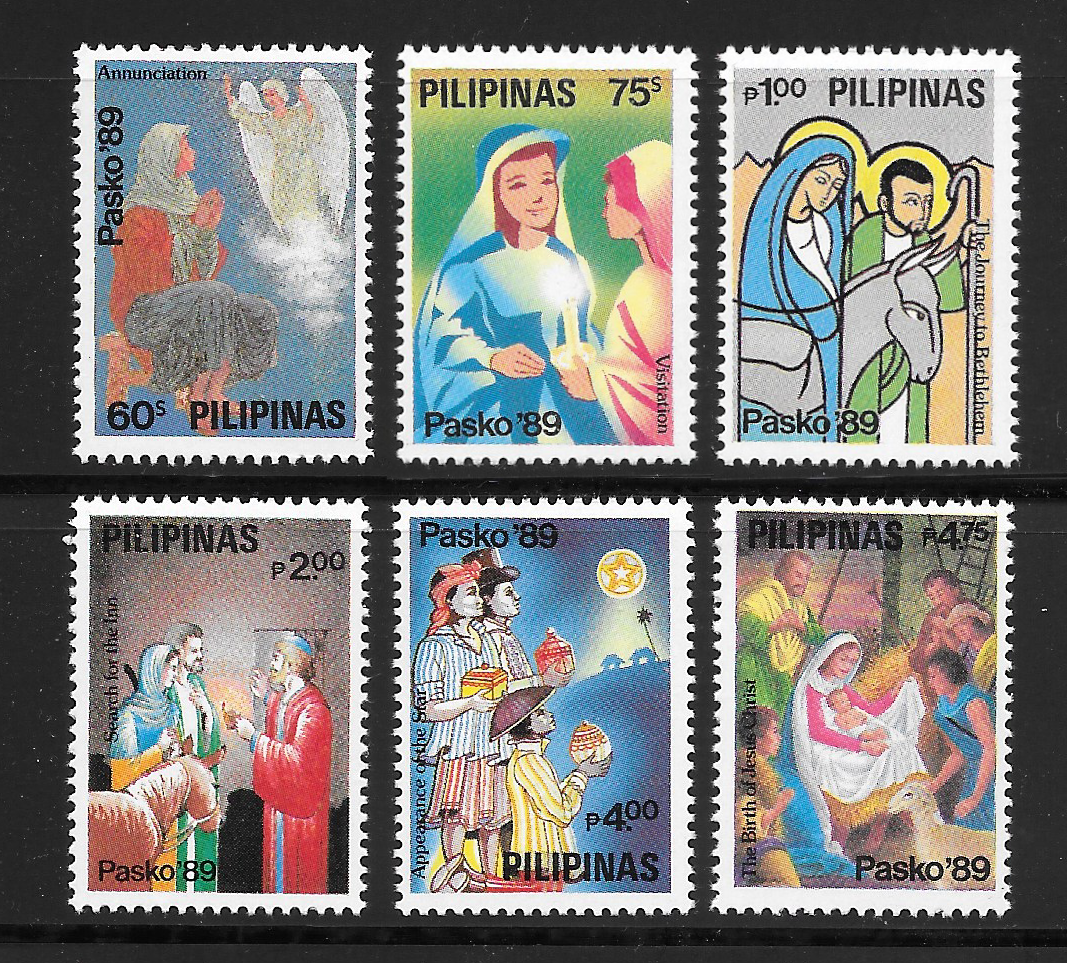
Philippines stamps featuring scenes from the Annunciation, Visitation, and Nativity, 1989

== Usage ==
The typical usage of Christmas stamps is to quickly apply them to a stack of Christmas cards to go out. In the age of email, Christmas stamps may represent some individuals' largest remaining use of stamps in a year, and it is not unusual to see "leftovers" appear on regular mail during the first months of the new year. In Australia and the Netherlands, Christmas stamps are sold at a discount, but can be used after Christmas with additional stamps to make up the correct rate.

== Collecting ==
Christmas is a popular theme for topical collecting. Because of the quantities printed, almost all Christmas stamps are easy to come by and of negligible cost. Collecting challenges would therefore be to get covers with apropos postal markings, such as a postmark on Christmas Day (not all post offices get the day off), from a particular location (such as Christmas Island; Christmas, Florida; Noel, Missouri; North Pole, Alaska; North Pole, New York; or Santa Claus, Indiana), or bearing a specific Christmas theme or slogan.

The Christmas Philatelic Club was formed in 1969 by Christmas stamp collectors and issues a quarterly journal, the Yule Log. A number of collectors treat Christmas collecting as a subcategory of religion on stamps.

== Other holiday stamps ==
The United States has occasionally issued stamps for other holidays, such as Thanksgiving and New Year's Day. Since the 1990s, stamps for Kwanzaa, Hanukkah, Eid, and Chinese New Year have become a regular part of the holiday program, although in contrast to Christmas stamps the designs tend to be re-used for several years, distinguishable only by a different denomination or year date.

In Japan, there is a longstanding tradition of a New Year's stamp. A number of Easter stamps have also been issued, but these are largely aimed at collectors.

Valentine's Day stamps are a more recent tradition in some countries.
