= Coil waste =

Type of stamp issue

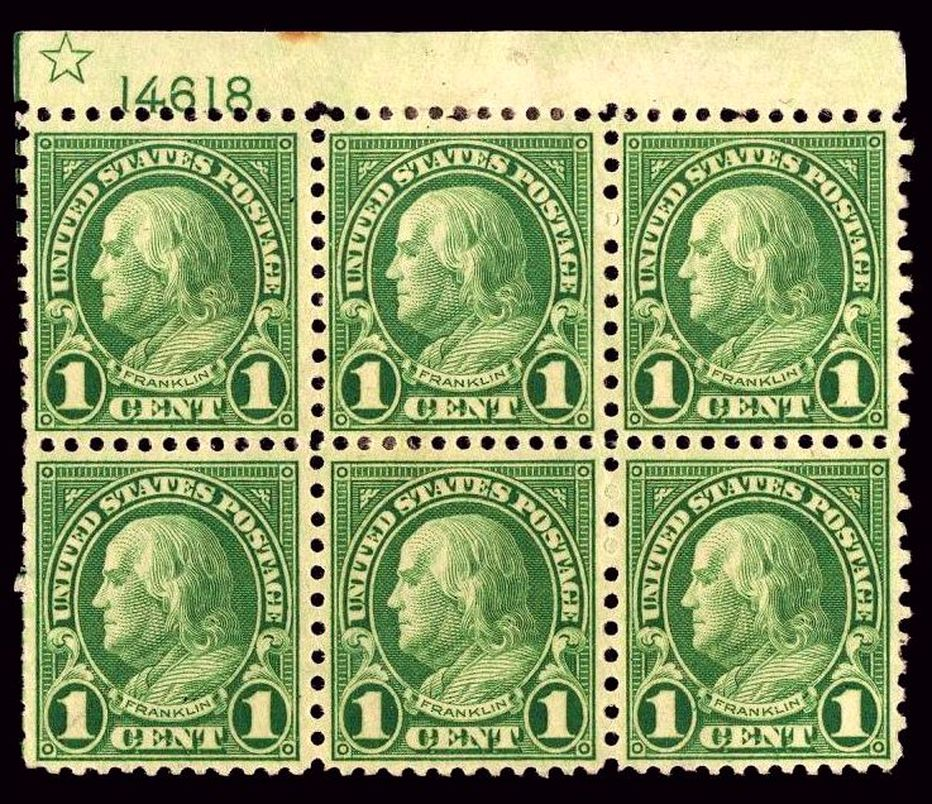
Scott #578: top margin block of 6 stamps made from coil waste of Scott #597

Coil waste is a type of U.S. stamp made from damaged or unusable printing stock intended for use as coil stamps and is a term applied to several stamp issues of the late 1910s and early 20s.

== History ==
Sometimes in the printing of coils on rotary presses, several stamps from the run were deemed unusable for coil production. Instead of discarding these, the Bureau of Engraving and Printing processed them through the flat-plate perforating machine to finish them as fully perforated stamps. These finished products are known as coil waste. While seemingly identical to normal fully perforated issues (which were printed on flat plate presses), coil waste stamps are distinguishable by their size: their designs are slightly wider or longer than normal because rotary press printing slightly stretches an image.

The stamps removed from coil production in the late teens and early twenties were "discarded as unfit," according to a report from a director of the Bureau of Engraving and Printing "on account of narrow margins, too close perforations, and other reasons." A notable example is a 1919 1¢ Washington stamp (Scott Catalogue #538). This, according to Max Johl, had "received the regulation one way [vertical] coil perforation while forming part of the long rolls of stamps printed on the rotary press. The coil perforating machines…fitted for perforating rolls of stamps could not be used to perforate sheets, so these [stamps] had to be perforated the other way (horizontally) on the regulation eleven gauge flat plate perforating machines." The rarest coil waste issue from the Washington-Franklin series is another 1¢ Washington stamp produced in 1921 (Scott #544). Other Washington-Franklin examples include Scott #539-541.

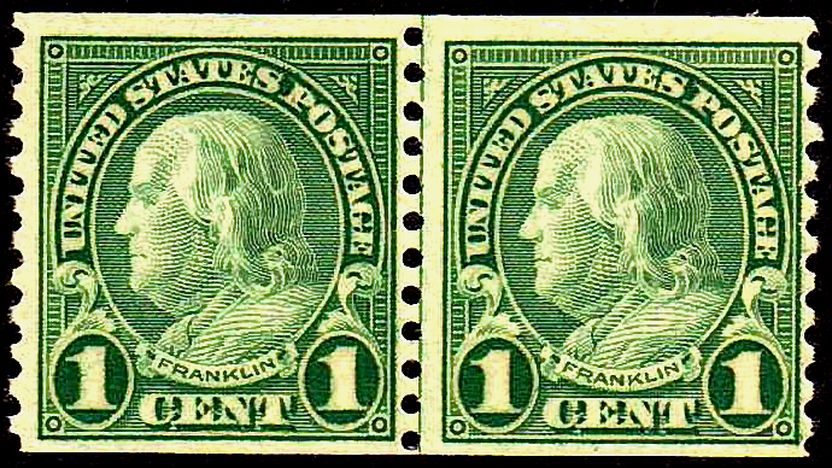
Stamps in a 'coil' configuration

In 1923, during the production of the U. S. Fourth Bureau definitive series, four coil waste issues were made from short ends left over after the long printed rotary rolls had been cut into proper coil lengths (such as 500 or 1000 stamps). The excess production occurred in the coil versions of the 1¢ Franklin and 2¢ Washington stamps (Scott #597 and 599). One batch of each issue had been perforated 10 vertically, and those stamps were then perforated 11 horizontally to produce Scott #578 and 579; the remaining, smaller group of short ends had not been perforated, and these were finished with gauge 11 perforations on all sides (Scott #594 and 595). The rarest of the four is #594: a 1¢ Franklin stamp.

Several extremely rare stamps from this period sometimes misidentified as coil waste were produced from the waste printing of sheet stamps. These include another 1¢ Franklin issue (Scott #596) and the perforated 11 rotary press Harding Memorial stamp (Scott #613).

== See also ==
- First U.S. coil stamps of 1902
- Washington Franklin coil stamps of 1908-1912
- Other examples of coil stamps
