= Washington–Franklin Issues =

American postage stamp series

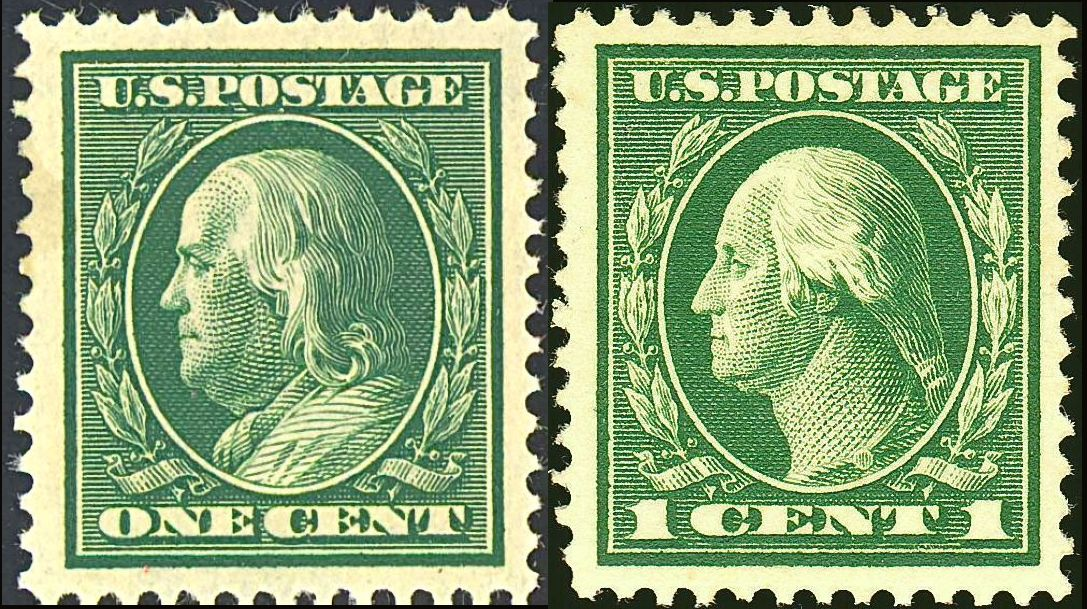
Washington–Franklins Wreath of Olive branches designs, issued 1908–1922

The Washington–Franklin Issues are a series of definitive U.S. Postage stamps depicting George Washington and Benjamin Franklin, issued by the U.S. Post Office between 1908 and 1922. The distinctive feature of this issue is that it employs only two engraved heads set in ovals—Washington and Franklin in full profile—and replicates one or another of these portraits on every stamp denomination in the series. This is a significant departure from previous definitive issues, which had featured pantheons of famous Americans, with each portrait-image confined to a single denomination. At the same time, this break with the recent past represented a return to origins. Washington and Franklin, after all, had appeared on the first two American stamps, issued in 1847, and during the next fifteen years, each of the eight stamp denominations available (with one exception) featured either Washington or Franklin.

In the early Washington–Franklin issues (1908–1911), every design incorporated a pair of olive branches surrounding one or the other of the two profiles. From 1912 on, however, the Franklin-head issues would instead appear with Oak leaves near the bottom of the oval in the image. Olive branches and oak leaves are often used as symbols for peace (olive branches) and strength (oak leaves), though no significance was officially acknowledged in their use here. The Washington–Franklins were issued in denominations ranging from 1 cent to 5 dollars, each value printed in different color ink. The two engravings of either Washington or Franklin are employed in five basic design themes (i.e., framework, ornaments, lettering) which in turn were used to print more than 250 separate and distinct stamp issues over a fourteen-year period. During this time seven separate series of the Washington–Franklins appeared in succession, each series differing somewhat from its predecessor in physical characteristics (i.e., paper type, perforation size, etc.), while some series would also introduce new denominations printed with new colors. Produced by the Bureau of Engraving and Printing in Washington D.C., these issues were generally printed by the flat-plate process, but several of the issues also employed other new and experimental printing methods, including use of the revolutionary rotary printing press and the offset printing process. The first Washington–Franklin postage stamp to be released was a 2-cent stamp issued on November 16, 1908. Other denominations soon followed and would continue to appear through the first World War years, with the last Washington–Franklin postage stamp issued in 1923. The series thus survived for almost fifteen years, longer than any previous U.S. postage stamp series produced by a single printing organization.

== Background ==
During the several decades that led up to the production of the Washington–Franklin issues the printing technology of U.S. Postage stamps was in many respects still in its development stages. As a consequence the U.S. Post Office would often receive complaints from the general public about its postage stamps. In 1869 the Post Office faced its first nationwide complaints when it issued a set of ten stamps that broke from the tradition of honoring and depicting statesmen (selected Presidents and Franklin) on the faces of all U.S. Postage stamps. Withering criticism also cited the small size and inconvenient shapes of the 1869 stamps and faulted their adhesive gum as inadequate. Consequently, this issue was short lived and pulled from post offices across the nation. As the years passed other complaints ranged from criticism about stamp subject and design, difficulty with perforations and even objections to the often unpleasant taste of the gum on the backs of stamps. Many of the criticisms also came from postal clerks who complained about the insufficiently varied choice of colors used on the issues, which sometimes resulted in the same or similar color appearing on several different denominations, making it visually difficult to sort mail quickly. Shortly after the turn of the 19th–20th century the problem of improving stamps and production prompted debates in Congress and the Senate, debates into which President Theodore Roosevelt sometimes injected himself. For example, Roosevelt argued that in observance of the upcoming 100th anniversary of Lincoln's birth, Lincoln should be included in the new definitive 1908 issue then being planned. Lincoln, however, was omitted: instead he would be honored with his own anniversary commemorative stamp in 1909. Many of the innovations employed in the production of the Washington–Franklin Issues were the result of this ongoing effort to improve on the production of U.S. Postage.

== Stamp design ==
The Washington–Franklin issues employed a classical yet simple style in their designs with either Washington or Franklin displayed in full profile, both figures surrounded, in early issues, with an arrangement of olive branches. This style was in stark contrast with that of the definitive stamps previously issued in 1902–03 as that issue not only presented a variety of American historical figures, but framed them with an elaborate assortment of allegorical and ornamental designs—which, in spite of their artistic quality, were criticized as so flamboyant that they detracted from the central portrait and theme. The relatively austere design consequently chosen for the Washington–Franklins was the result of this concern.

In keeping with the quest for simplicity the original design concept was not for a Washington–Franklin series, but for a series devoted exclusively to Washington, with all its near-identical stamps exhibiting the same image of the first United States President—they would differ from one another only in denomination and color. This idea originated with one Charles H. Dalton of Boston, who, in a letter to his Senator, Winthrop M. Crane, expressed admiration for the current British stamps, all of which employed the same profile portrait of King Edward VII. Dalton recommended that the next U.S. series be similarly uniform, with every one of its stamps presenting the same profile head of Washington found on the 2¢ denomination of the 1894 First Bureau Issue. The senator passed this letter on to the Postmaster General, George Meyer, who by and large followed Dalton's recommendation. Full uniformity, however, would have violated a long-standing postal tradition dating back to 1851, which had placed Franklin on every definitive one-cent stamp issued by the U.S. Post Office. It may have been for this reason that Franklin was admitted to the 1908 series in the single case of the one-cent stamp. The Washington–Franklin series resulting from this compromise was designed by the renowned artist Clair Aubrey Huston, known for his many postage stamp designs. Most denominations of the 1902–03 series had been identical in color to their counterparts in the preceding First Bureau Issue. By contrast, the Washington–Franklin set preserved the previous colors only for its five lowest values: new and very different colors were chosen for all denominations of 6-cents and higher.

Despite the vast number of Washington–Franklin stamps released—as said, more than 250 in seven different series—only five basic designs were employed during their printing and production. Two separate engravings—one of Washington, the other of Franklin—are used in the five basic design types. The engraving of George Washington was modeled after a bust (sculpture) by the celebrated sculptor Jean Antoine Houdon. The image of Franklin in this issue was engraved by Marcus Baldwin who modeled his engraving after a photograph of a plaster bust of Franklin created by Jean Jacques Caffieri in 1777. As the issue evolved through its seven series, Washington and Franklin replaced each other on some values—marking the first time in United States postal history that two men had appeared on the same denomination in one issue. Indeed, both Washington and Franklin ultimately appeared on the 1-cent, 8-cent, 10-cent, 13-cent, 15-cent, 50-cent and 1-dollar values.

The five basic design types:

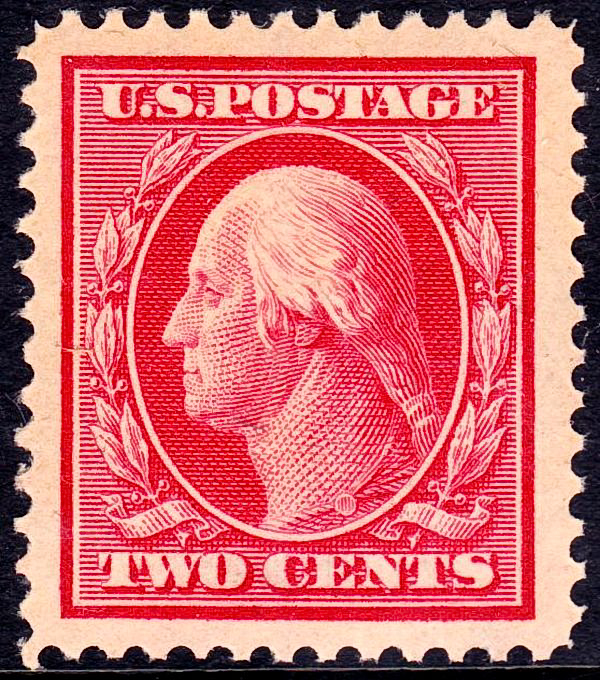
Issue of 1908

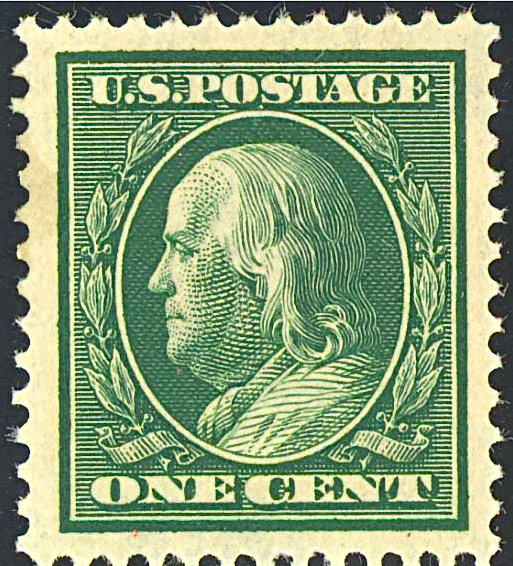
Issue of 1908

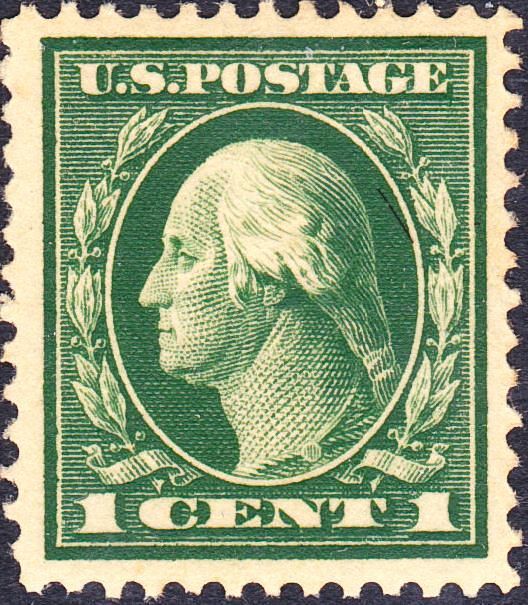
Issue of 1912

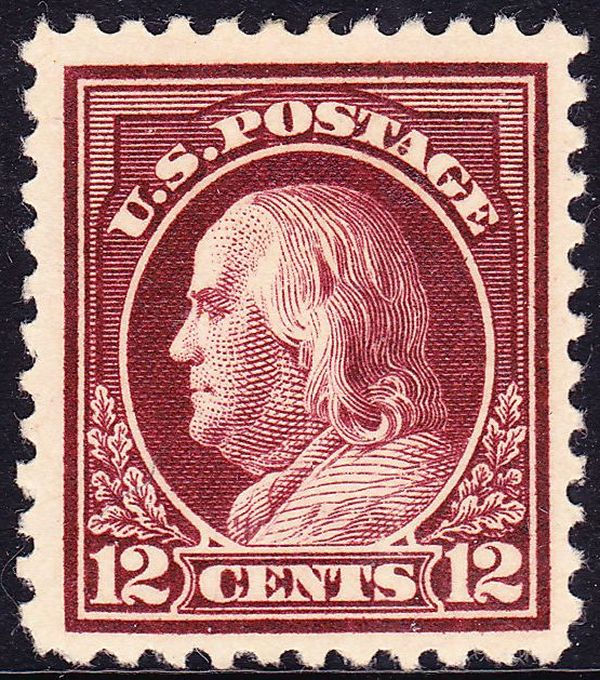
Issue of 1917

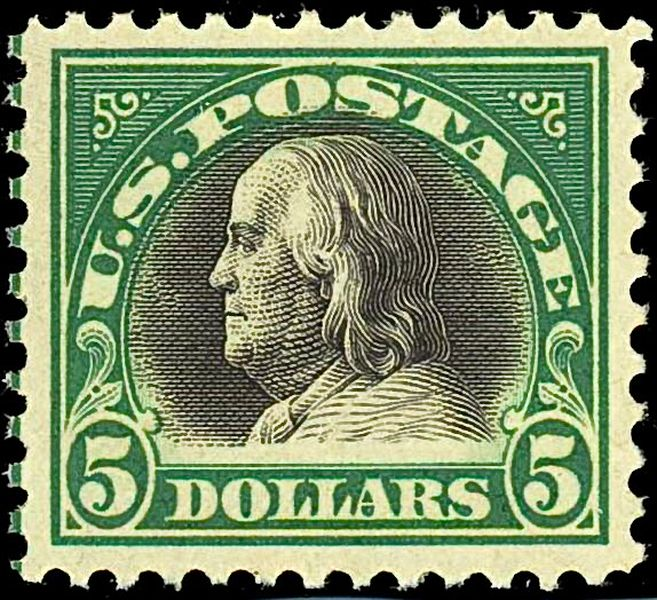
Issue of 1918

The same engraving of either Washington or Franklin is used in five design types.
At first glance, the design types may appear almost the same.

- Washington with Olive branches, postage spelled out, TWO CENTS
- Franklin with Olive branches, the denomination spelled out, ONE CENT (denomination is only spelled out on the 1- and 2-cent, 1908, 1909 and 1910 issues, six stamps.)
- Washington with Olive branches, postage in numeral form, used on all denominations with the exceptions of the 9, 11, 12, 20 and 30-cent and the 2 and 5-dollar amounts.
- Franklin with Oak leaves, postage in numeral form, used on denominations from 8-cents to 1-dollar.
- Franklin with horizontal frame, used on 2 and 5-dollars denominations, postage amount in numeral form.

In the case of the first four designs, preparing printing plates for each stamp required two separate transfer phases. Two different steel dies were used, one containing the Washington or Franklin engraving, the other providing the framework and lettering. After every image on the steel plate had been impressed with both design components, the plate was heat-treated and hardened to prepare it for printing. In the lower-denomination Washington–Franklin Issues, 400 separate impressions appeared on a printing plate, referred to as a flat plate. The higher value of 1-dollar was printed from a flat plate of 200 subjects. The fifth design required different plates for each of the two elements, as printing took place in two stages: the frame was first printed in color and, in a second impression, the Franklin portrait was laid over it in black. These $2 and $5 values employed plates of 100 subjects.

== Stamp issues ==
The first Washington–Franklin stamp issued was a two-cent red Washington-head, issued on November 16, 1908, to pay the first class postage on a standard letter. The seven separate and distinct Washington–Franklin series appeared at intervals of a year or two and included denominations that ranged from 1-cent to 1 or 5 dollars, depending on the series. The different issues can be distinguished from one another by one or more of several factors: perforation gauge, the type of stamp paper—or, in some unusual varieties, by the printing method used. Four or five basic paper-types were employed during the life of the issue. Two of these have different watermarks (consisting of single-line and double line letters: 'USPS'), while another paper-type had no watermarks (watermarks are detected by placing the stamp in a special fluid). In 1909 a much less common type of bluish paper was used, made of 35% rag stock combined with the usual wood pulp and can readily be identified by its faint bluish-gray color. (N. B., Some contend that bluish paper contained only 10% rag stock.) Later in the same year the Post Office is supposed to have experimented with China clay paper, but whether such a paper stock actually existed has become a matter of dispute.

=== Stamp issues chart ===
The Washington–Franklin stamp issues of 1908–1923: dates of issue
Denomination	1908–1909 DL-Wmrk perf.12	1909 Bluish-paper perf.12	1910–1911 SL-Wmrk perf.12	1912–1914 SL-Wmrk perf.12	1914–1915 SL-Wmrk perf.10	1916–1917 Un-Wmrk perf.10	1917–1923 Un-Wmrk perf.11
1 cent	F ^{O} – Dec 2 1908	F ^{O} – Feb 16 1909	F ^{O} – Nov 23 1910	W – 12 Feb 1912	W – 5 Sep 1914	W – 27 Sep 1916	W – 23 Mar 1917
2 cents	W ^{T} – 16 Nov 1908	W ^{T} – 16 Feb 1909	W ^{T} – 23 Nov 1910	W – 12 Feb 1912	W – 5 Sep 1914	W – 25 Sep 1916	W – 23 Mar 1917
3 cents	W – 24 Dec 1908	W – 16 Feb 1908	W – 16 Jan 1911	–	W – 18 Sep 1914	W – 11 Nov 1916	W – 23 Mar 1917
4 cents	W – 24 Dec 1908	W – 16 Feb 1908	W – 20 Jan 1911	–	W – 7 Sep 1914	W – 7 Oct 1916	W – 23 Mar 1917
5 cents	W – 19 Dec 1908	W – 16 Feb 1908	W – 25 Jan 1911	–	W – 14 Sep 1914	W – 17 Oct 1916 – 7 Mar 1919 (red error)	W – 23 Mar 1917 – 23 Mar 1917 (red error)
6 cents	W – 31 Dec 1908	W – 16 Feb 1908	W – 25 Jan 1911	–	W – 28 Sep 1914	W – 10 Oct 1916	W – 23 Mar 1917
7 cents	–	–	–	W – 29 Apr 1914	W – 10 Sep 1914	W – 10 Oct 1916	W – 24 Mar 1917
8 cents	W – 12 Dec 1908	W – 16 Feb 1908	W – 8 Feb 1911	F – 12 Feb 1912	F – 26 Sep 1914	F – 13 Nov 1916	F – 24 Mar 1917
9 cents	–	–	–	F – 29 Apr 1914	F – 6 Oct 1914	F – 16 Nov 1916	F – 12 Mar 1917
10 cents	W – 7 Jan 1909	W – 16 Feb 1908	W – 24 Jan 1911	F – 11 Jan 1912	F – 9 Sep 1914	F – 17 Oct 1916	F – 24 Mar 1917
11 cents	–	–	–	–	F – 11 Aug 1915	F – 16 Nov 1916	F – 19 Mar 1917
12 cents	–	–	–	F – 29 Apr 1914	F – 10 Sep 1914	F – 10 Oct 1916	F – 12 May 1917
13 cents	W – 11 Jan 1909	W – 16 Feb 1908	–	–	–	–	F – 10 Jan 1919
15 cents	W – 19 Jan 1909	W – 16 Feb 1908	W – 1 Mar 1911	F – 12 Feb 1912	F – 16 Sep 1914	F – 16 Nov 1916	F – 21 May 1917
20 cents	–	–	–	F – 29 Apr 1914	F – 19 Sep 1914	F – 5 Dec 1916	F – 12 May 1917
30 cents	–	–	–	F – 29 Apr 1914	F – 19 Sep 1914	F ~	F – 12 May 1917
50 cents	W – 13 Jan 1909	–	–	F – 12 Feb 1912 – 29 Apr 1914	F – 10 Dec 1915	F – 2 Mar 1917	F – 19 May 1917
1 dollar	W – 29 Jan 1909	–	–	F – 12 Feb 1912	F – 8 Feb 1915	F – 22 Dec 1916	F – 19 May 1917
2 dollars	–	–	–	–	–	'02 (Madison) 22 Mar 1917	F – 19 Aug 1918
5 dollars	–	–	–	–	–	'02 (Marshall) 22 Mar 1917	F – 19 Aug 1918
W = Washington; W ^{T} = Washington with TWO spelled out; F = Franklin; F ^{O} = Franklin with ONE spelled out; DL-Wmrk = Double-line watermark; SL-Wmrk = Single-line watermark; Un-Wmrk = No watermark; '02 = Reprint of 1902

== Year series ==
The first three series of Washington–Franklin postage stamps depicted Washington on every denomination except for the ONE CENT issue, which presented Benjamin Franklin's profile inside the same frame design as that of the Washington issues. On January 11, 1912 Franklin for the first time began to appear on denominations of 8-cents and higher. Each of the seven successive series brought various changes in design, color, perforations, paper and sometimes printing methods. In addition to these series, there are a few individual stamps—issued near the end of the Washington–Franklin era—that can not be categorized within one of the series because of design or perforation anomalies. The last Washington–Franklin was issued in May 1923, a 1-cent green Washington-head with olive leaves, (Scott 544) would coincidentally also become the rarest postage stamp of the issue (errors excepted) and can only be positively identified by measuring its outer frame dimensions. Because its distinct features are not readily apparent, this variety sometimes turns up in every day collections. This, however, is unusual, as the stamp was printed in very limited quantities and consequently any surviving examples of this variety are exceedingly rare and valuable today.

=== 1908–09 series ===
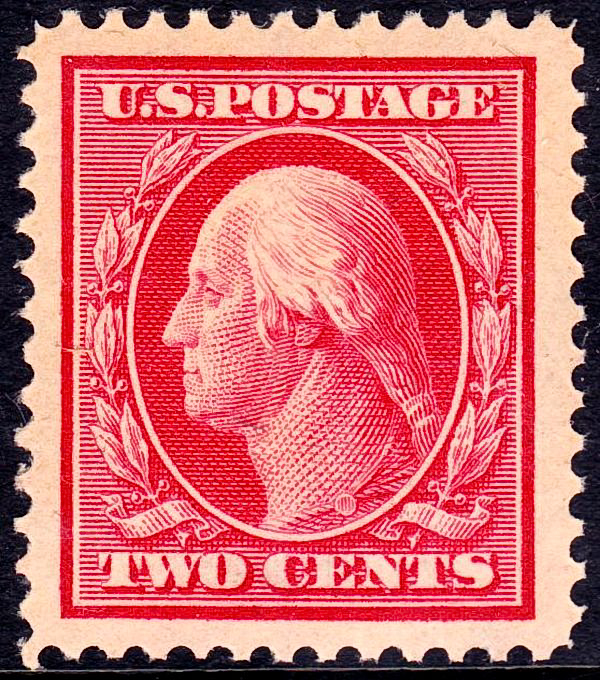
1st Washington–Franklin Issued November 16th, 1908 Washington and Olive branches design

The Washington–Franklins were initially released to the public one and two stamps at a time, first appearing in Post Offices in December of 1908. The issues portray Washington and Franklin in profile surrounded by a pair of olives branches. On the 1 and 2-cent denominations the amount of postage is worded as ONE CENT and as TWO CENTS, while on the remaining denominations (3-cents to 1 dollar) the amount of postage appears in numerals. Franklin is depicted only on the one cent denomination in this series; Washington appears on the values from two cents to 1-dollar. (see: WF chart) The Post Office decided not to include 2-dollar or 5-dollar denominations in the series because ample quantities of the 2- and 5-dollar stamps from the 1902–03 series were still on hand (indeed, additional supplies of these values would not be needed until 1917).

This first Washington–Franklin issue appeared with gauge 12 perforation and was printed on paper having a double-line watermark consisting of the letters USPS embedded in the fibers. This particular watermark had large double-lined letters which often weakened the sheets of stamps, causing the frequent separation of stamps at the Post Office before they even reached the customers. As a result, the double-line watermark was discontinued in 1910 and replaced by a single line watermark with smaller letters. Because of the high demand for the one and two cents denominations, these issues were also printed in booklet form, with six stamps to a page.

Using the printing technique employed with the Bureau triangle issues of 1894, the paper used to print the Washington–Franklin issues was first dampened so that printing ink would be absorbed more thoroughly and evenly. However, this resulted in paper shrinkage when the sheets of stamps dried, causing the rows of stamps to be drawn closer together. As the flat printing plates for this issue had individual stamp impressions spaced 2 mm apart the resulting dried sheet would leave stamps spaced about 1½ mm apart, making it very difficult to line up rows of perforations accurately between the rows of stamps. Many sheets were issued with perforations somewhat off center, while roughly 20% of the sheets emerged with perforations so off-center that they were deemed unsalable and had to be destroyed. Paper shrinkage would lead the Bureau to try various approaches to the problem in the following issues. Finding well-centered stamps with wide margins in any denomination in this early issue is a challenge for the collector and well centered examples command prices that far exceed average catalog values.

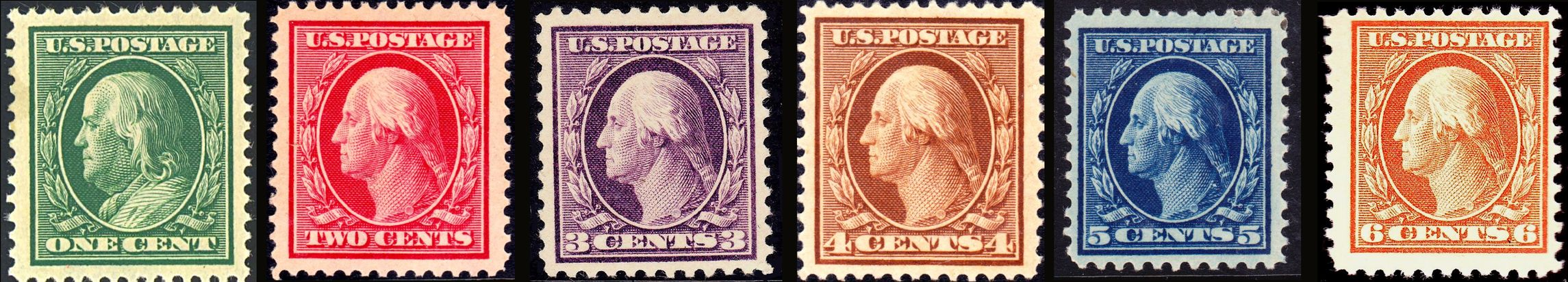
Issues of 1908–1909, 1-cent through 6-cents: The ONE CENT and TWO CENTS designs appear in the 1909 and 1910–11 series.; The 3c, 4c, 5c and 6c designs appear in every series except that of 1912–1914.; The 7c Washington-head (shown below) doesn't appear until 1914.

(see: WF chart)

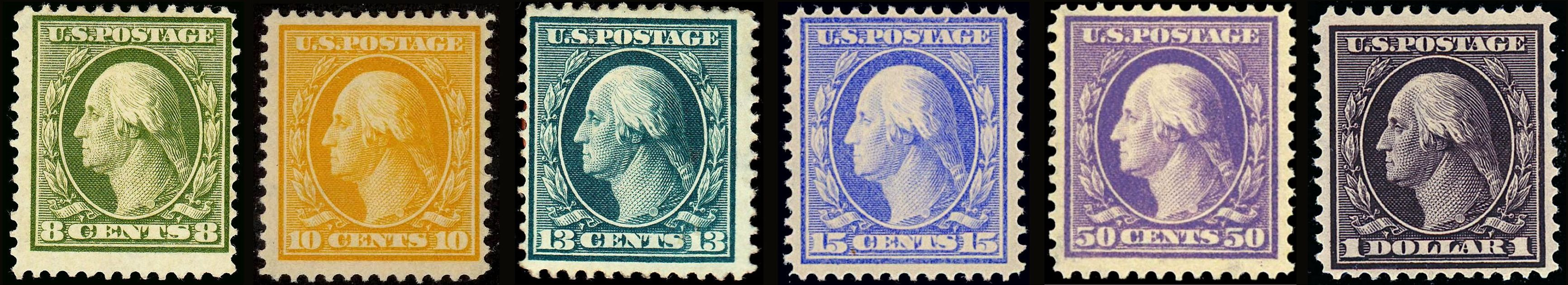
Issues of 1908–1909, 8 cents through 1 dollar: The 8c, 10c and 15c Washington-heads also appear in the 1909 and 1910–11 series.; The 13c Washington-head also appears in the 1909 series.; The 50c and 1-dollar Washington-heads are exclusive to the 1908 series and appear nowhere else in the Issue.; There are no Washington-heads with denominations of 9c, 11c, 12c, 20c 30c, $2 and $5.

=== 1909 series ===
In 1909 the U.S. Post Office, in its effort to counter the effects of shrinkage, experimented with different paper, printing the next series of postage stamps on a bluish-paper reportedly consisting of a 35% rag stock used conjunction with the usual wood pulp (this percentage has been called into question by some analysts). When placed next to a stamp of ordinary wood pulp paper and the reverse sides are inspected the difference in paper tone is readily apparent. This experimental paper was supposed to reduce shrinkage from the paper dampening involved in the wet-sheet printing process; but while it represented a marginal improvement over the 1908 issues, it did not solve shrinkage problem sufficiently and its use was discontinued after a brief period. The perforation gauge of this issue is again 12. Stamps printed on bluish paper have denominations that range from 1c through 15c and were sold only in Washington DC, so used examples on cover usually bear a Washington DC postmark. Consequently most of the issues from this series are scarce and generally expensive. The 1 and 2 cent stamps are the most affordable for collectors, for they were issued in larger quantities, approximately 3 million of each issue printed. The remaining denominations appeared in very limited quantities and are (sometimes very) valuable. Rarest of all are the 4-cent and 8-cent stamps, which, in fact, were never released for postal use; apparently, they reached the public in 1915 when the Post Office traded them to stamp dealers in exchange for rare issues missing from the Smithsonian Institution collection of U.S. stamps. The denominations of 7, 9, 11 and 12 cents do not occur on bluish paper. (see: WF chart)

It was long believed that later in 1909, the Post Office experimented briefly with another paper-type designed to reduce shrinkage, one containing a China clay additive that gave its appearance a grayish tone very similar to that of bluish-paper. China-clay versions of the 1¢ through 15¢ values are listed in standard catalogues—appearing as variants of the 1908–09 stamps, rather than being classified as a separate series or as part of the bluish paper issue. Some philatelists believe that China clay stamps are a myth, for examination of some purported examples failed to find any clay in the composition of the paper.

=== 1910–11 series ===
When producing the 1910–11 series, the Post Office abandoned experiments with paper additives, but took two other measures to compensate for paper shrinkage. First, the stamp-images on the outer columns of the printing plate were set wider apart (3 mm) than those toward the center (2 mm). Second, the elaborate double-line watermark—deemed a possible source of uneven paper-shrinkage—was discontinued and replaced by a simpler "single-line" watermark, which, it was hoped, would ensure more uniform shrinkage. In other respects, the 1910–11 series mirrors its predecessors. Like them, it is perforated twelve and it employs the same Franklin- and Washington-head designs. It does not, however, include all the denominations available in earlier issues, but omits the 13c Washington stamp, which had been offered in the two previous series, as well as the 50c and $1 Washington issues printed in 1908–09. None of these three designs would appear again in subsequent Washington–Franklin series.

=== 1912–1914 series ===
By 1912, the Post Office had received numerous complaints from postmasters that the many near-identical Washington stamps in the issue confused postal clerks, too often leading them to give customers higher denominations than they paid for. The Post Office addressed this problem in the series of 1912–1914 by making a significant change in the line up in the Washington–Franklin denominations. Washington would now appear on the lower values only; all denominations of 8c and higher would display the Franklin-head. The realignment provided a clear visual distinction between the cheaper and the more expensive stamps. To further heighten the distinction, the Post Office now introduced the oak-leaf frame for the Franklin stamps, thus eliminating olive branches from the higher values along with Washington.

To be sure, assigning Washington exclusively to the small denominations meant that Franklin had to be displaced from the iconic position he had enjoyed on 1¢ definitive stamps for over sixty years. However, putting Franklin on the lower values would have violated a tradition more noticeable to the public: that of having Washington's image appear on the normal-first-class-letter-rate stamp of every definitive series. (This tradition dated back to 1851 and had only been ignored once: in the disastrous 1869 issue.)

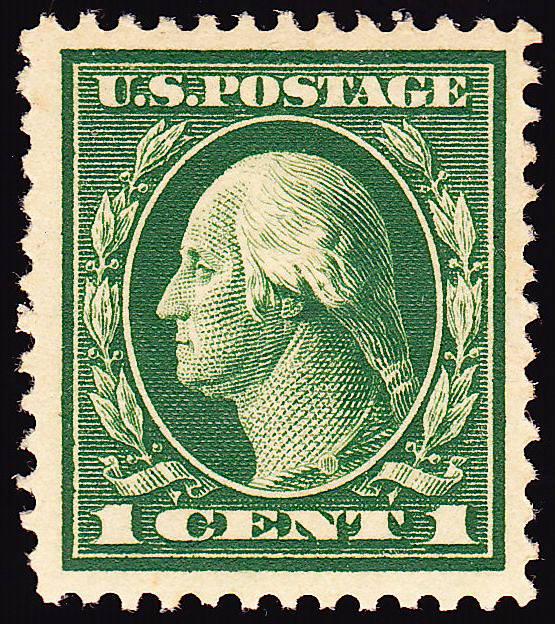
Washington and Olive-branches Issue of 1912 Washington appears on the 1-cent stamp of this Issue for the first time.

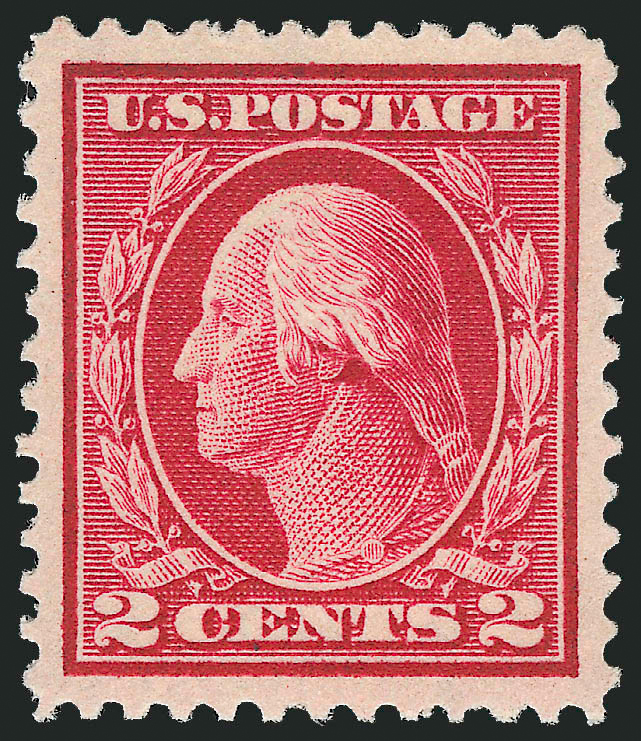
2-cent with numerals

Accordingly, in early 1912, the Bureau of Engraving and Printing released a new version of the 1-cent stamp, this time with the profile of Washington instead of Franklin who had been on all 1-cent green issues of the three previous series. This was the first U.S. Postage stamp to go on sale in booklet form before sheets were available: the booklet appeared on February 8, while the sheet was not issued until four days later. The denominations of the 1- and 2-cent stamps now appeared in numerals rather than lettering. The new Franklin oak leaf design had already been introduced in January with the issue of a 10-cent yellow stamp, and the other high values soon reached post offices. In the 1912–1914 series, the denominations of 7, 9, 12, 20 and 30-cents appeared for the first time in the Washington Franklin issues.

This series is again perforated 12, and the values between 1¢ and 50¢ are printed on single-line watermarked paper. The 50¢ and $1 issues, however, are instead printed on double-line watermarked paper left over from the production of the 1908 series. Denominations not included in this printing are the 3, 4, 5 and 6-cent stamps as there were still adequate stocks of these available. Of special interest is the first appearance of the 7-cent Washington-head, with its premier color of black, issued on April 29, 1914. An estimated 5 million 7-cent stamps were printed, a relatively low number for a definitive issue. It was available in post offices for only five months, for this denomination went through a perforation change in the next series, thus making it a new and separate issue.

New arrivals:

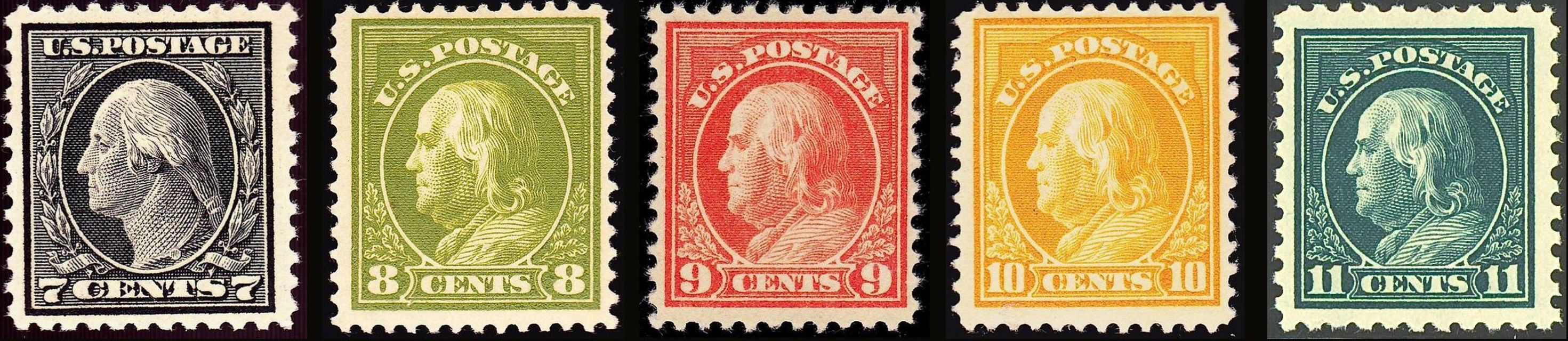
1912–1914 series Washington 7c in black and Franklin with Oak leaves, 8c to 11c

(see: WF chart)

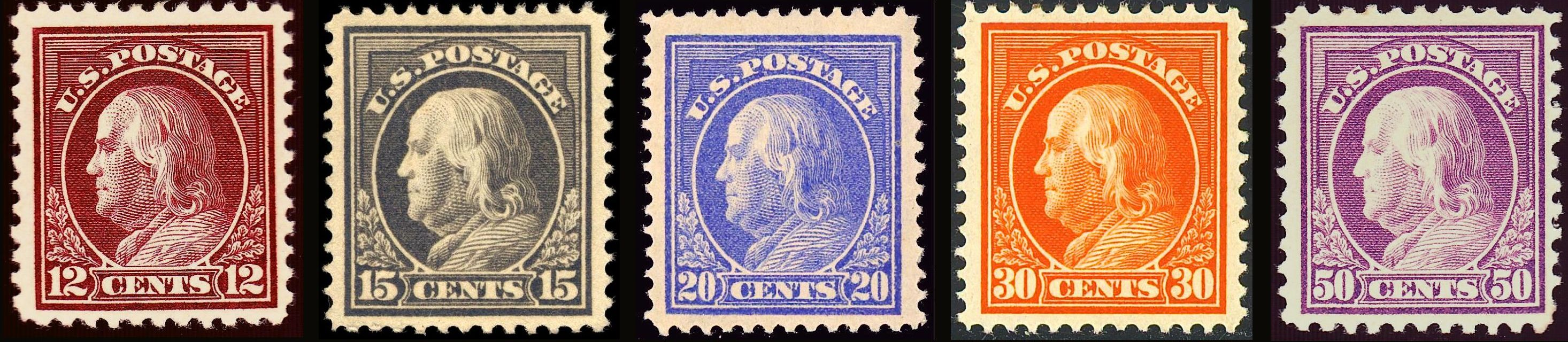
1912–1914 series, Franklin with Oak leaves, 12c to 50c

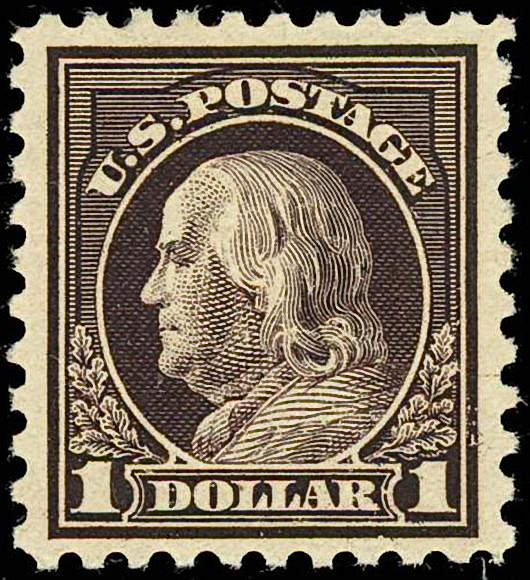
1st Franklin 1-Dollar Issued February 12, 1912

The 50-cent and 1-dollar Franklin issues made their debut on February 12, 1912. These stamps were printed from plates of 200 subjects instead of the 400-subject plate used on all lesser denominations. The 200-subject printing plate required paper whose dimensions were compatible with its size and operation. Since there were remaining stocks of double-line watermarked paper from 1908 intended for plates with 200 subjects on hand, this paper was used for these two issues. When stocks of this paper ran out some two years later, new single-line watermarked paper was cut to the proper size and used. Consequently the 50-cent Franklin occurs on two paper-types in this one series. The 1-dollar Franklin was not printed again on this new paper as existing stocks were ample up to 1916. The 50-cents and 1-dollar Franklin and Oak leaves issues occur again in the following three series of the Washington–Franklin Issue. (see: WF chart)

=== 1914–15 series ===
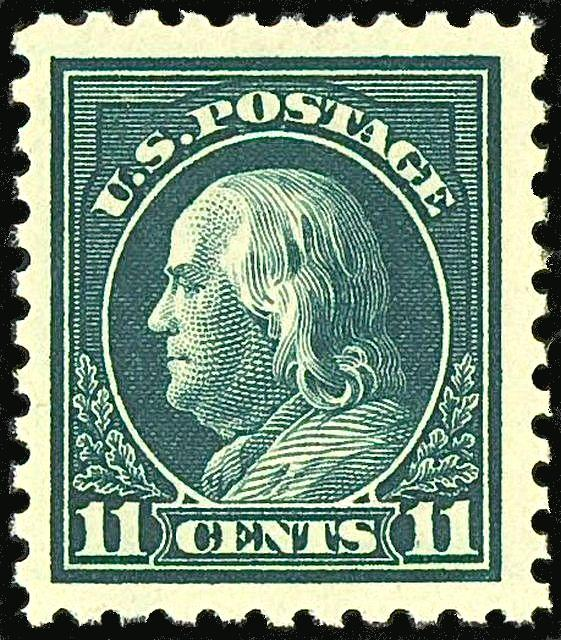
1st Franklin 11-cent Issued August 11, 1915

This series again includes Washington-heads on denominations 1-cent through 7-cents and Franklin-heads on the 8-cent through 1-dollar values. It is the first series to include the 11-cent denomination with the Franklin and Oak leaves design, colored slate-green, which appears again in the following two series of 1916 and 1917. Lower values of the series are printed from plates of 400 on single-line watermarked paper, while the one-dollar Franklin is printed from plates of 200 subjects and uses double-line watermarked paper of the appropriate size. Because of stamp separation problems in previous issues using gauge 12 perforations, particularly when attempting to tear a block of stamps from the sheet to cover postage on parcels, this series was instead issued with gauge 10. The perforations of this gauge would soon prove to be a problem also, as the coarser gauge of perforation made it more difficult to separate stamps, often resulting in torn stamps.

=== 1916–17 series ===
The series of 1916–17 brought an end to the use of watermarked paper. By this time, the stock of older 2 and 5-dollar stamps had been exhausted; but rather than producing new Franklin designs for these values, the Post Office merely ordered reprints of the 2 and 5-dollar stamps used in 1903, which depict, respectively, James Madison and John Marshall. It can be thus be argued that these two stamps do not truly belong to the Washington–Franklin Issues. Up until this time each new series had either added new denominations or discontinued older ones, but this series remained the same, issuing every denomination, with the same colors, from 1-cent to 1-dollar that had been included in the 1914–15 series, and also retaining that issue's gauge 10 perforations. (see: WF chart) Most experts long believed that the 30¢ denomination had been omitted from the 1916–17 series—indeed, no post office records indicate that this value was ever issued. Claims by one famous collector, Benjamin Miller, that he indeed possessed an unwatermarked perforated 30¢ stamp from 1916–17 were discounted, and, accordingly, in the original Scott catalogue, the 20¢ stamp of the series—No. 476—was immediately followed by the 50¢—No. 477. The years following World War II, however, saw the discovery of additional copies of the 30¢ value that seemed unwatermarked, and in 1957, Scott chose to label this stamp No. 476A. Yet Scott's numbering did not permanently settle the issue; for in 2008 a stamp-rating service, Professional Stamp Experts, discovered a "ghost" watermark on a copy of 476A and this raised the question of whether, after all, the unwatermarked version had ever been legitimately issued. PSE at that point ceased certifying copies of this stamp. The 30¢ unwatermarked perforated 10 stamp from 1916–17—if it exists at all—remains the rarest of any Washington–Franklin issue belonging to a full series: fewer than 300 copies have been certified by various expertizing services.

=== 1917–1920 series ===
The 1917–1920 series was perforated 11 and included all the denominations found in the two preceding series, but added three new Franklin-heads of 13-cents, 2 and 5-dollars. The two higher denominations appeared late in this issue as the Bureau of Engraving and Printing was busy replacing worn printing plates and dealing with various experiments and innovations that delayed production of the 2 and 5 dollar plates. Perhaps to identify these stamps as luxury items, they were printed in two tones, with the vignette head in black and the frame in color. They were further distinguished from lower values by their use of landscape format rather than the normal portrait orientation. Because the 2 and 5 dollar Franklin-head stamps were the two largest denominations they are often referred to by collectors as the 'Big Bens'. The 2-dollar Franklin was intended to be printed in carmine-red and black, but somehow the color of the printing ink from the particular lot that was used turned out to have a distinct orange tone. Variations in color in printing ink is somewhat common in stamp production, but the variance in this case ventured into a different color completely—orange. By the time this acute color variance was brought to the attention of officials a good number of sheets had already been distributed among the various post offices and were most likely already in circulation. In 1920 a second printing of the 2-dollar Franklin was issued, this time with the colors that were originally intended, carmine-red and black. These were printed and remained in use for some 3 to 4 years and therefore quantities of the red and black variety out number the orange and black approximately 15 to 1. Quantities issued are, for 2-dollar orange and black, 47,000 (470 sheets of 100), and 2-dollar carmine-red and black, 743,600 (7,436 sheets of 100).

While the denominations from 1c to 1-dollar were printed with plates of 400 subjects and cut into sheets of 100 stamps for sale at the post office, the 2 and 5-dollars issues were printed with plates of 100 subjects, did not require cutting into separate sheets and were issued as is. Consequently there are no 2 and 5-dollar stamps with straight edges. By contrast, all the lower- denomination stamps are found in straight edged examples, produced when the sheets were cut in quarters.

New arrivals in the 1917–1920 series:

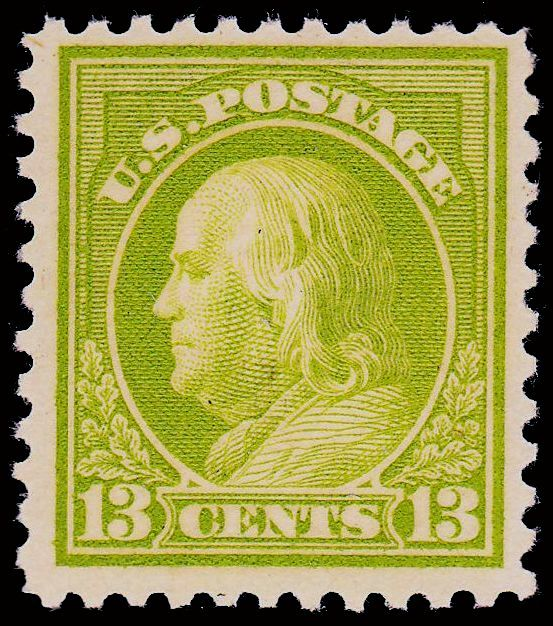
1st / only Franklin 13c issue of 1919

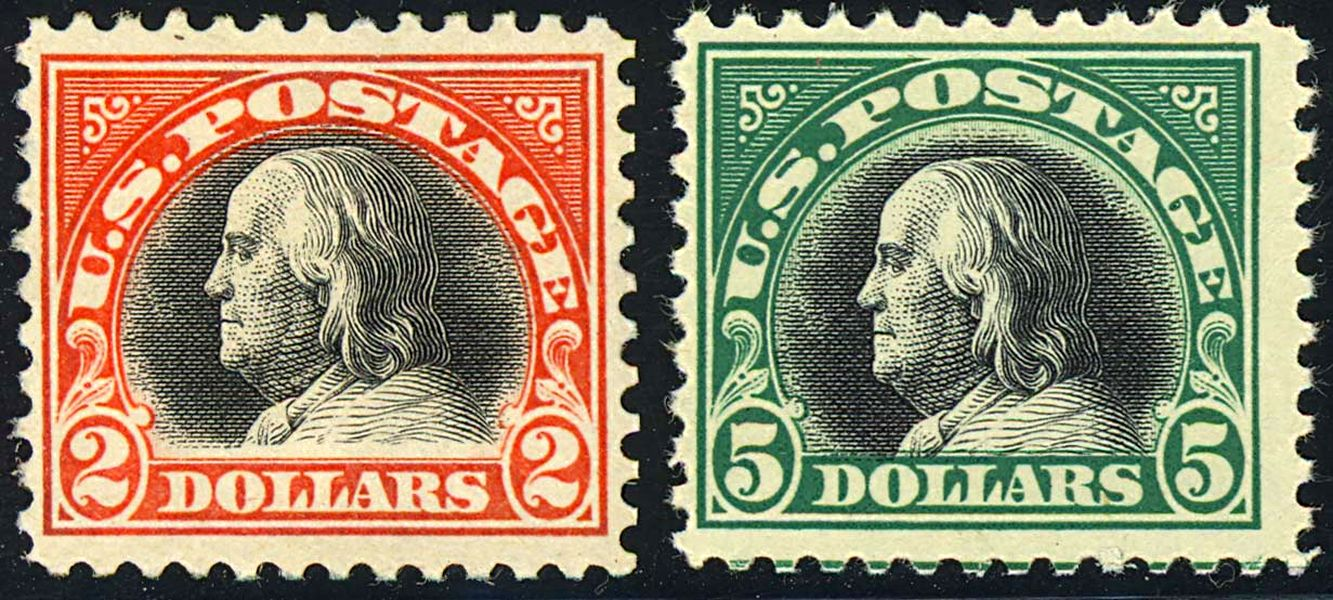
The 'Big Bens' Issue of 1918

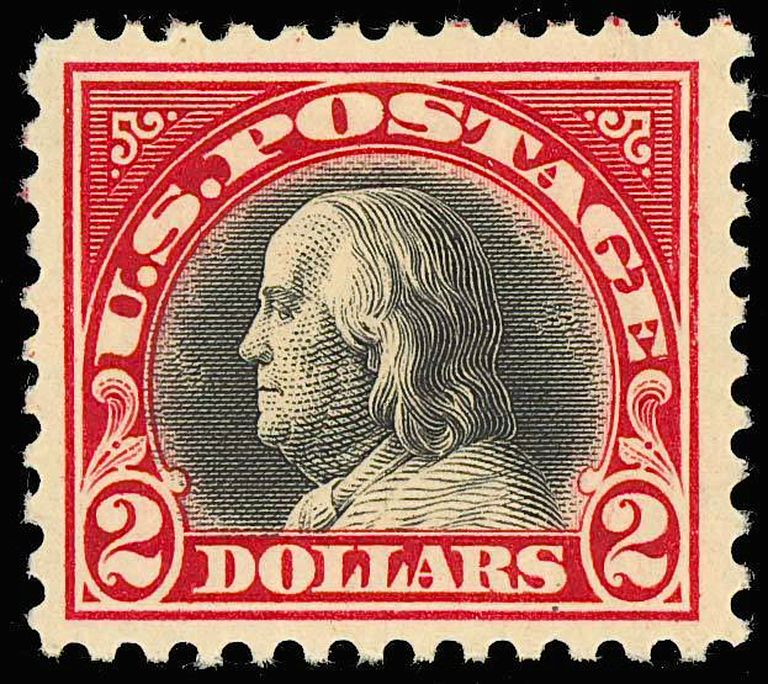
Franklin 2-dollar reprint issue of 1920

(see: WF chart)

== Offset printing ==
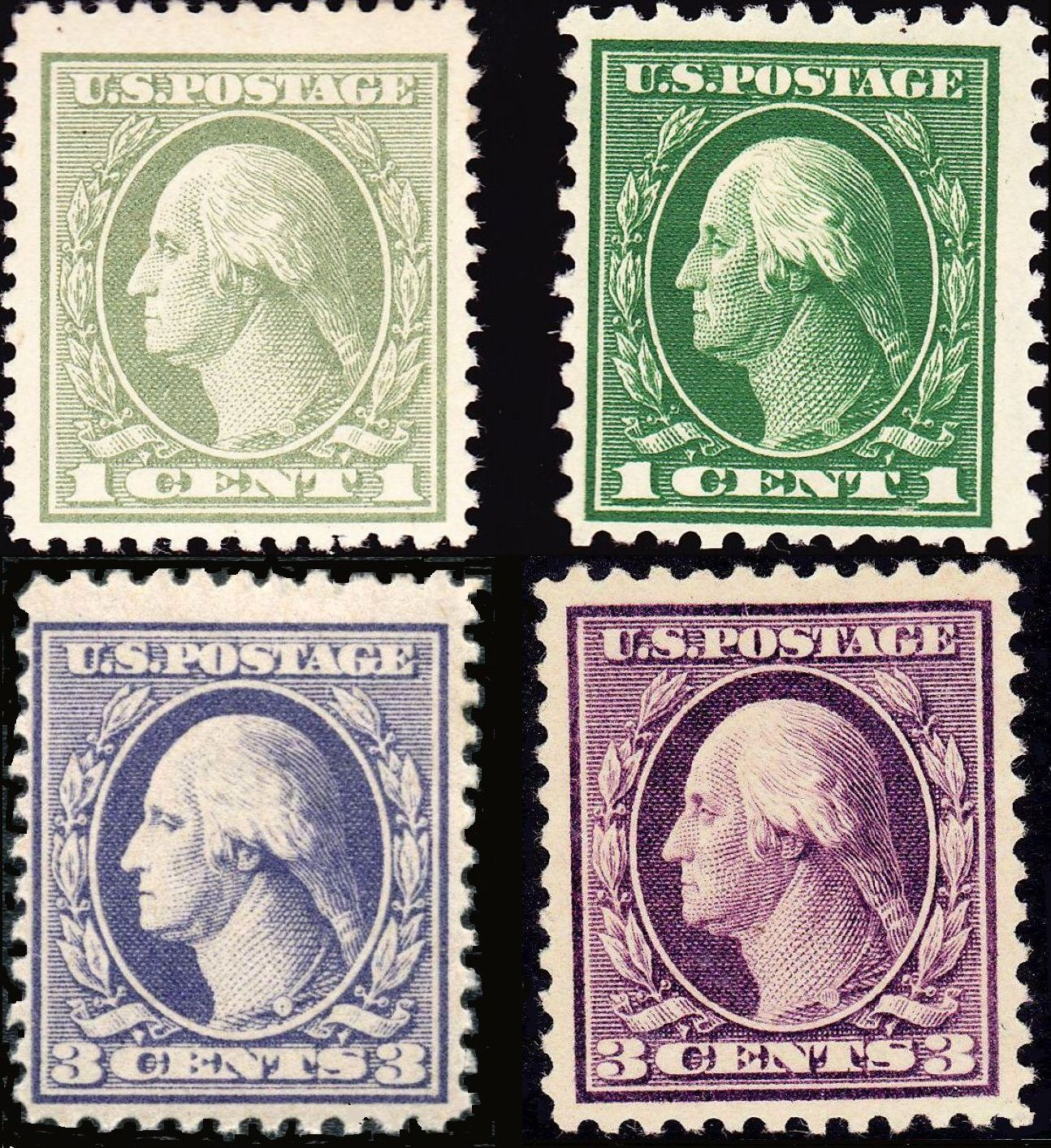
Offset stamps (left) as compared to engraved stamps

During World War I, several ingredients of postage stamp ink that had previously been imported from Germany became unavailable, and the domestic materials that replaced them had significant gritty impurities, with the result that the stamp printing plates became worn much more quickly. In response to this problem, the U.S. Post Office employed the new offset printing process to produce several separate Washington-head issues. The offset method involved taking a photo of a die proof of the postage stamp and through a special process, transferring an image of its negative to a plate of glass, which became the actual printing plate. The set-up and development process was more involved in the preparation stages than the engraving process, but once the photo mask was made it only took about an hour to produce and replace a worn printing plate. The offset process produced an image of lesser quality with a smooth surface, as compared to that of an engraved stamp whose lines are raised above the surface of the paper. A stamp produced by the offset process almost always possesses a softer or grayish tone to its color and is usually easy to distinguish, especially when placed next to a similar stamp printed by the engraving process.

The Washington–Franklin offset printing
Washington heads:	1918–1920 Perf.11 - Un-watermarked
1 cent	525, (536 perf.12½)
2 cents	526, 527, 528, 528a, 528b
3 cents	529, 530
Nine stamps	(numbers from Scott)

Three denominations of 1, 2 and 3-cents were printed by the offset printing process. There are two types of the 1-cent denomination, five different types of the 2-cent variety, and two types of the 3-cent variety. These types possess differences in the lines on the toga rope in Washington's profile and usually require the aid of magnification to positively identify their different characteristics. Stamps produced by the offset process were issued with a perforation gauge of 11 with the one exception of the 1919 1-cent issue with gauge 12½. The first Washington–Franklin stamp printed by the offset process was a 3-cent Washington-head, issued on March 22, 1918. The 1-cent green followed and was issued on December 24, 1918. The five types of the 2-cent denomination were issued sometime later on March 15, 1920. Beginning in 1919 an imperforate variety (no perforations between stamps) was also issued. All three denominations were printed and possess the same variations in type that are found on the perforated issues, as the imperforate issues were produced from the same plates. There were no Franklin-heads printed with the Offset printing press.

== Imperforate stamps ==
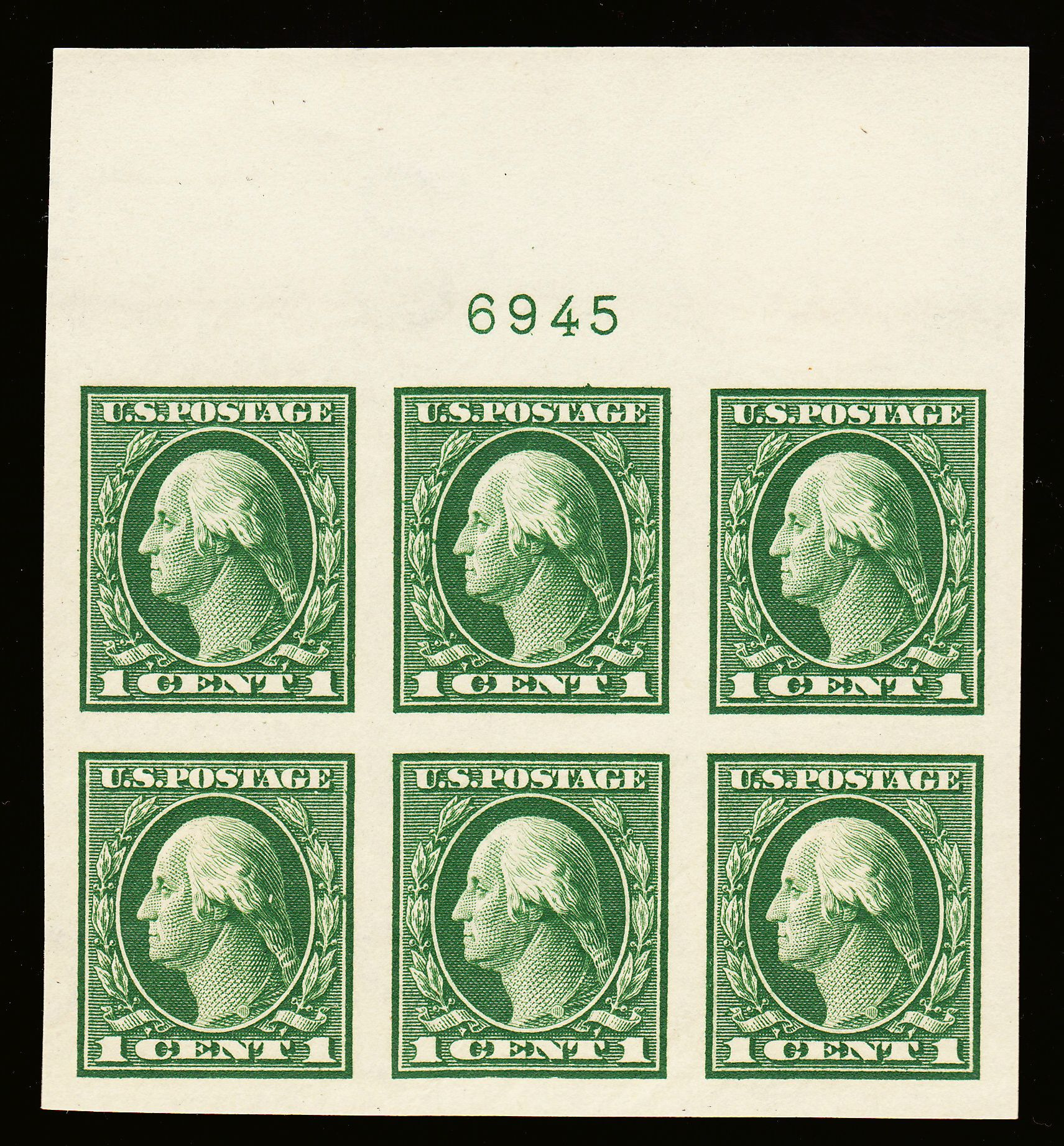
Imperforate block of 6 with printing plate number.

Postage stamps issued in sheets with no perforations between the rows and columns of individual stamps are referred to as imperforate. The Washington–Franklin issue contains several series of imperforate stamps that occur on a small range of denominations from 1 through 5-cents. These stamps were issued in imperforate form to accommodate several major vending machine companies of that period who used this stock for coil stamps in their machines which were in wide use about the country. Many of these companies applied their own form of perforations, such as the Schermack, Mail-O-Meter, and Brinkerhoff vending machine companies. There were at least seven such firms, each having its own patented machines. Imperforate stamps were issued in full uncut sheets of 400 subjects or in coil rolls of 500 or 1000 stamps. The imperforate issues were printed from a flat plate with 400 subjects until 1918 when they were produced on the rotary press from continuous rolls of paper. Imperforate coils from this stock are much rarer than examples cut from full sheets.

The Washington Franklin Imperforate issues
Denomination	1908-09 DL-Wmrk	1911 SL-Wmrk	1912 DL-Wmrk	1914 SL-Wmrk	1916-17 Un-Wmrk	1918-1920 Un-Wmrk
1-cent	343 - Fo	383 - Fo	408 - W	-	481 - W	531 - W
2-cents	344 - Wt	384 - Wt	409 - W	459 - W	482 / 482a - W	532-34b - W
3-cents	345 - W	-	-	-	483 - W/484 - W	535 - W
4-cents	346	-	-	-	-	-
5-cents	347 - W	-	-	-	485 - W (red)	-

W = Washington / Wt = Washington with TWO spelled out F = Franklin / Fo = Franklin with ONE spelled out
DL-Wmrk = Double-line WaterMark / SL-Wmrk = Single-line WaterMark / Un-Wmrk = No Watermark
Numbers for stamps from Scott Specialized US Stamp Catalogue

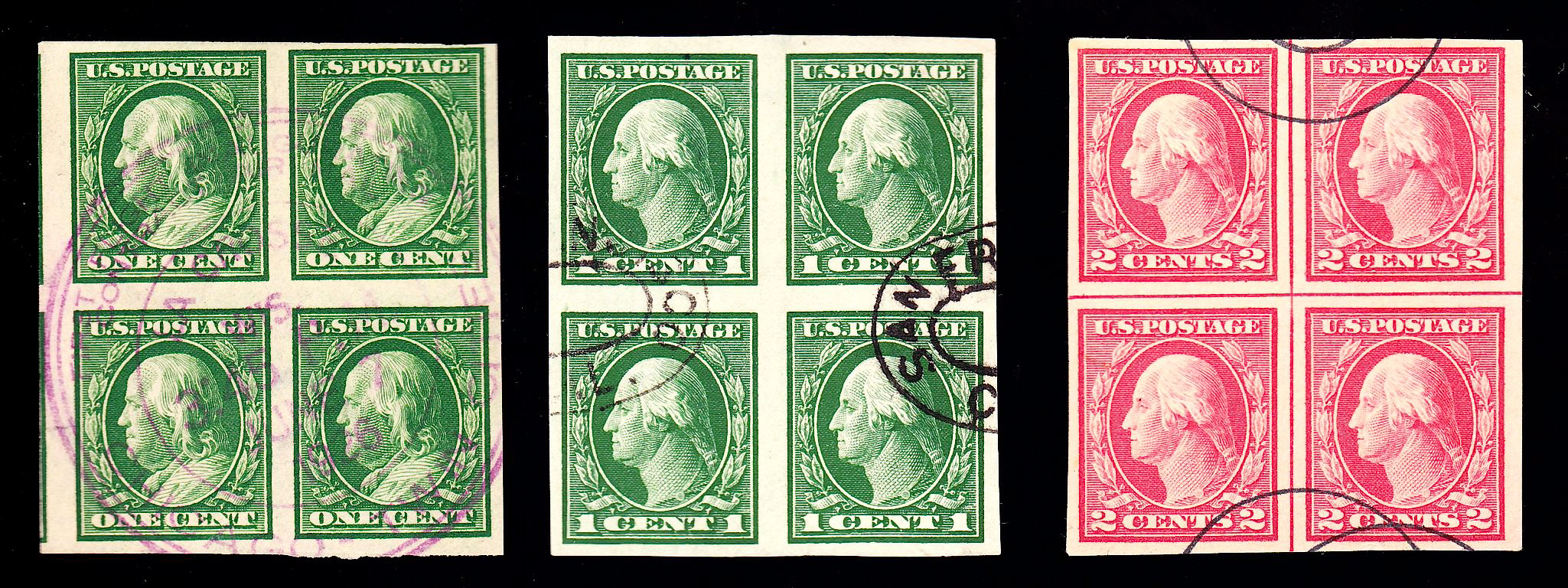
Postally used examples of imperforate Washington–Franklins

== Coil stamps ==
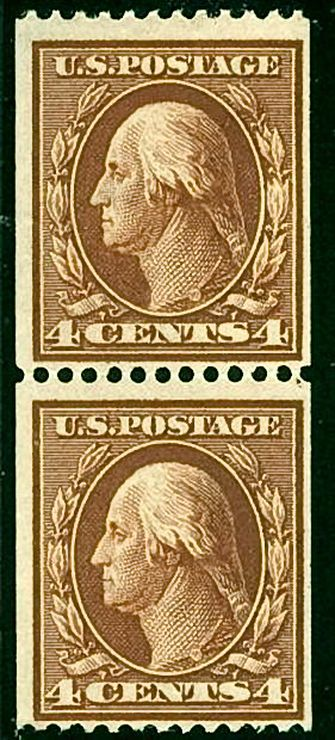
Washington on coil stamps, vertical pair issue of 1908

Postage stamps that come in strips with the individual stamps arranged side by side or one above the other and rolled into a coil for sale at the post office are referred to as coil stamps. The coil configuration made the repeated removal of individual stamps easier for the clerks and others who dealt with mass mailings on a daily basis. The coil configuration also made it possible to dispense individual stamps in vending machines. Responding to complaints from vending machine companies that coil stamps with standard perforations (perforated 12) separated too easily, the postal service introduced a much coarser gauge—perforated 8½—in 1910. This gauge, however, proved problematic for opposite reasons: the stamps proved too difficult to separate. As a result, a finer gauge, perforated 10, was used for coils from 1914 on.

From 1908 to 1914 coil stamps were printed with Flat Plate presses in sheets of 400 which were then cut into strips for coiling. In 1915 the Bureau began printing coil stamps from continuous rolls of paper with the Rotary Press. The printing plates were curved and affixed around a rotating cylinder, a process that stretched the images somewhat, making them slightly longer than similar images printed from a flat-plate. The difference in size becomes evident when the two different types are placed side by side.

Coil stamps are either perforated horizontally, with one stamp over the other, or vertically with the stamps situated side by side along the strip of stamps. Made from the same paper stock as sheet stamps, the coil stamps were accordingly issued concurrently with the regular Washington–Franklins. The denominations for coil stamps of these series range only from 1-cent up to 10-cents. While the 1–5 cent denominations were issued almost continuously the 10-cent coils were only issued twice, once as a yellow Washington-head stamp first issued in 1908, (See: Coil stamps Table-1) and once as a 10-cent yellow Franklin-head coil that wasn't issued until 1916. (See: Coil stamps Table-2)

The Washington–Franklin coil stamps (Table 1 of 2)
Denomination	1908–09 DL-Wmrk Perf.12 Hz	1908–09 DL-Wmrk Perf.12 Vrt	1910 SL-Wmrk Perf.12 Hz	1910–11 SL-Wmrk Perf.12 Vrt	1910 SL-Wmrk Perf.8½ Hz	1910–13 Un-Wmrk Perf.8½ Vrt	1912 SL-Wmrk Perf.8½ Hz	1912 SL-Wmrk Perf.8½ Vrt
1 cent	348 – Fo	352 – Fo	385 – Fo	387 – Fo	390 – Fo	392 – Fo	410 – W	412 – W
2 cents	349 – Wt	353 – Wt	386 – Wt	388 – Wt	391 – Wt	393 – Wt	411 – W	413 – W
3 cents	–	–	–	389 – W	–	394 – W	–	–
4 cents	350 – W	354 – W	–	–	–	395 – W	–	–
5 cents	351 – W	355 – W	–	–	–	396 – W	–	–
10 cents	–	356 – W	–	–	–	–	–	–

W = Washington / Wt = Washington with TWO spelled out / F = Franklin / Fo = Franklin with ONE spelled out
Hz = Horizontal perf / Vrt = Vertical perf / DL-Wmrk = Double-line watermark / SL-Wmrk = Single-line watermark / Un-Wmrk = No watermark
Numbers for stamps from Scotts Specialized US Stamp Catalogue

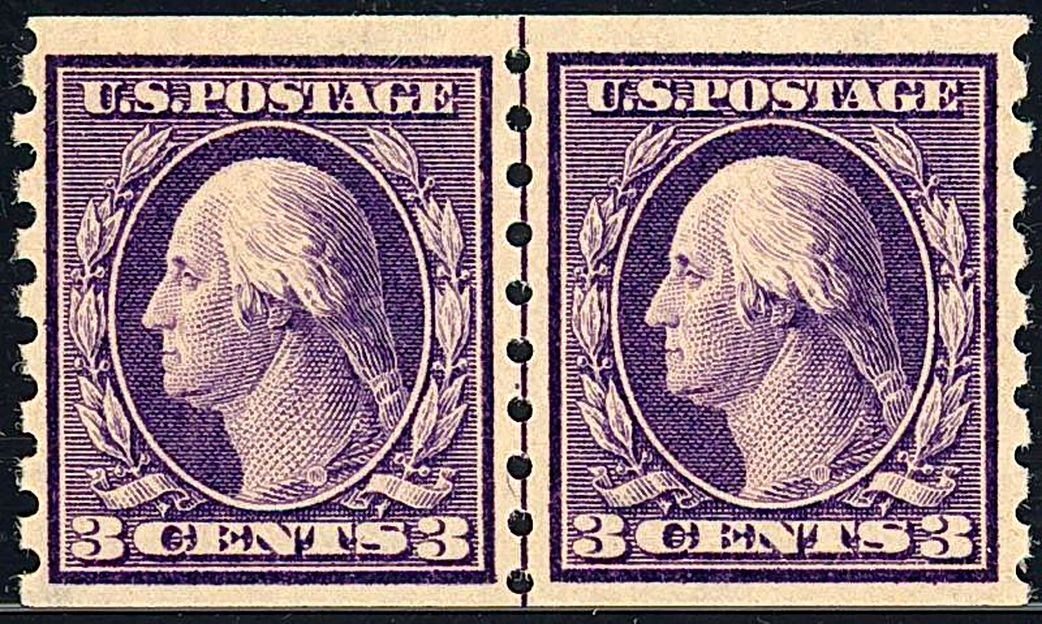
Coil stamps, center-line pair issue of 1912

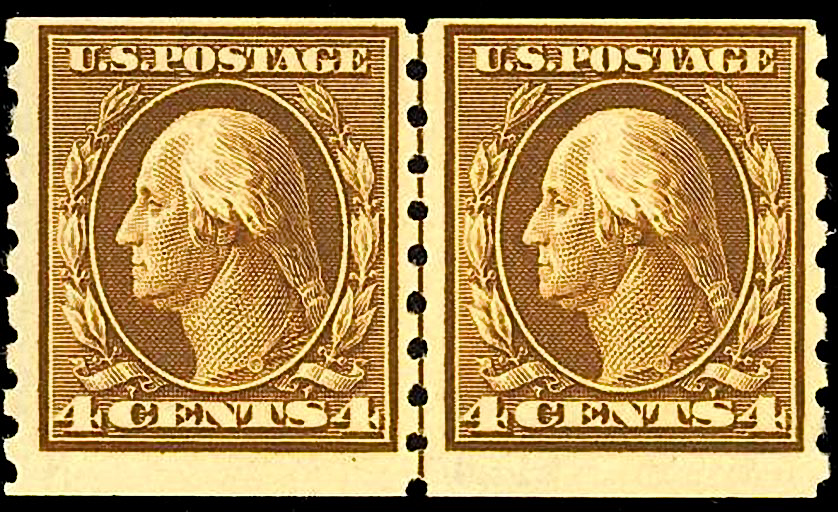
Coil stamps, center-line pair issue of 1912

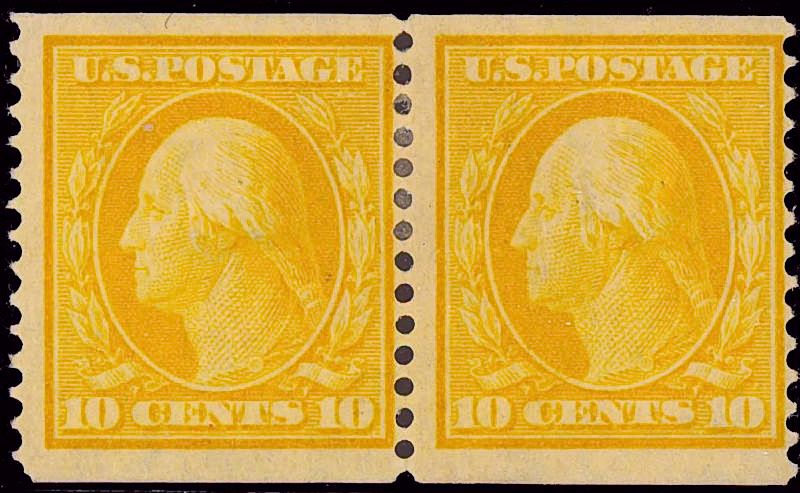
Coil stamps, pair issue of 1909

The Washington–Franklin coil stamps (Table 2 of 2)
Denomination	1914 SL-Wmrk Perf.10 Hz	1914–15 SL-Wmrk Perf.10 Vrt	1915–16 DL-Wmrk Perf.10 Hz	1914–16 SL-Wmrk Perf.10 Vrt	1916–19 SL-Wmrk Perf.10 Hz	1916–22 Un-Wmrk Perf.10 Vrt
1 cent	441 – W	443 – W	448 – W	453 – W	486 – W	490 – W
2 cents	442 – W	444 – W	449 – W	453 – W	487–88 – W	491–92 – W
3 cents	–	445 – W	–	456 – W	489 – W	493 – W
4 cents	–	446 – W	–	457 – W	–	495 – W
5 cents	–	447 – W	–	458 – W	–	496 – W
10 cents	–	–	–	–	–	497 – F

W = Washington / F = Franklin / Hz = Horizontal perf / Vrt = Vertical perf
DL-Wmrk = Double-line watermark / SL-Wmrk = Single-line watermark / Un-Wmrk = No watermark
Numbers for stamps from Scotts Specialized US Stamp Catalogue

Notes:

- Each of the year series produced stamps with denominations of 1c and 2c that were issued with both horizontal and vertical perforations. The remaining denominations of 3c to 10c were issued with mostly vertical perforations.
- There is only one example each of the Washington 3c, 4c and 5c stamps issued with horizontal perforations.
- Neither the Washington-head nor Franklin-head 10-cent coil was ever issued with horizontal perforations, hence the issues only existed with stamps situated next to one another on a coil.

=== Orangeburg coil ===
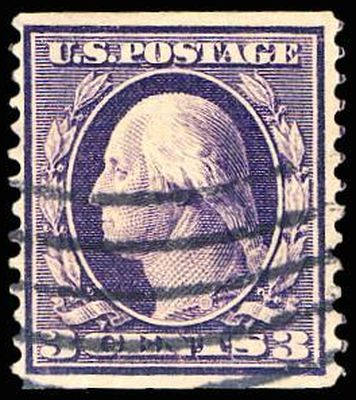
The Orangeburg coil Issue of 1911

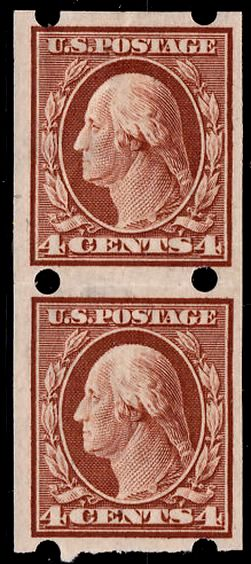
Brinkerhoff perforations

A 3-cent Washington-head coil stamp (Scott 389) issued in 1911 is commonly referred to as the Orangeburg coil. It was printed with the flat-plate press on single-line watermarked paper with vertical, gauge 12, perforations. The Post Office produced only a small batch of these stamps (it would soon switch over to gauge 8½ perforations for coils) and apparently sold them all to the Bell Pharmaceutical Company, which used 3¢ coil stamps to send samples of their products to physicians through the mail. The actual quantity issued remains unknown. The earliest known use on cover is dated April 27, 1911. Due to the quantity of mail, they were put through the first-class canceling machine at Orangeburg, New York and were mailed third-class. Because these stamps were used on third class mail, most were eventually discarded. Owing to its limited and specific usage philatelists were at first unaware of this issue for approximately two years and so very few examples were saved and collected in mint condition, which accounts for their rarity of this issue today. Approximately twelve covers have been certified as genuine by the Philatelic Foundation. The Orangeburg coils are the rarest coils of the Washington–Franklin issues.

=== Private perforations ===
Beginning on January 3, 1911 the Bureau of Engraving and Printing issued the 1-cent and 2-cent denominations in imperforate form on single-line watermarked paper specifically for use by at least seven different private coil-stamp vending machine companies. Each company used its own distinctive types of perforations, and most firms continued to experiment with them. Thus on the 1-cent issues, these five companies employed a total of 18 different types of private perforations, while 19 types exist on the 2-cent denomination. These private perforations, designed to fit the specific mechanisms of the various vending machines, were applied to imperforate sheets of 400 stamps after those sheets had been cut into either vertical or horizontal strips (the first such sheets had been issued in 1906 at the request of various vending machine companies). Joseph Schermack is generally credited with producing the first coil stamp vending machine. Privately applied perforations continued to be used well into the 1920s, and comprise a distinctive segment of U.S. postal history.

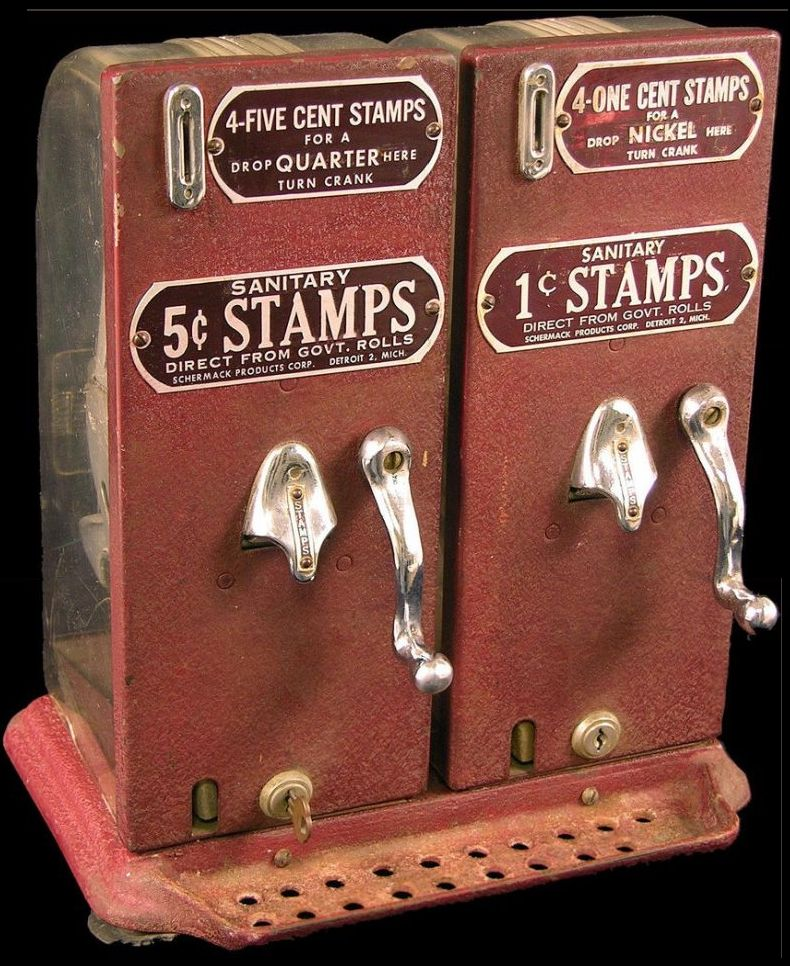
Schermack Stamp Vending Machine Courtesy National Postal Museum

There are no known records of actual quantities issued for private perforation types, however relative rarity of the various types is known from years of stamp sales and auction results. The Farwell type 3A2 is the most rare variety of the private perforations. Counterfeits perforations applied to the imperforate variety are somewhat common among several of the types, usually among items having a far lower value than the coil with privately applied perforations. Coil-stamp pairs with a center line mark in between the stamps are also targets for counterfeiters as the item itself is scare or rare and with the addition of fake perforations, the rarity of the item is compounded allowing its value to go up exponentially if not detected. With two exceptions, each vending machine company that applied private perforations produced several different distinct types: i.e. the Schermack vending machine company produced five different perforation types, Mail-o-meter produced six different types, Brinkerhoff produced four different types. Other companies include The John V. Farwell Company which produced eleven different types of perforations and the U.S. Automatic Vending Company which issued four types. By contrast, the Attleboro company and The International Vending Machine Company each produced only one type.

Outlining all the various types of private perforations involves a considerable amount of specialized information requiring a good number of accompanying illustrations and is therefore beyond the scope of this section. Further inquiry into private perforations can be made with information available in the external links section under Privately applied perforations.

Private perforation varieties

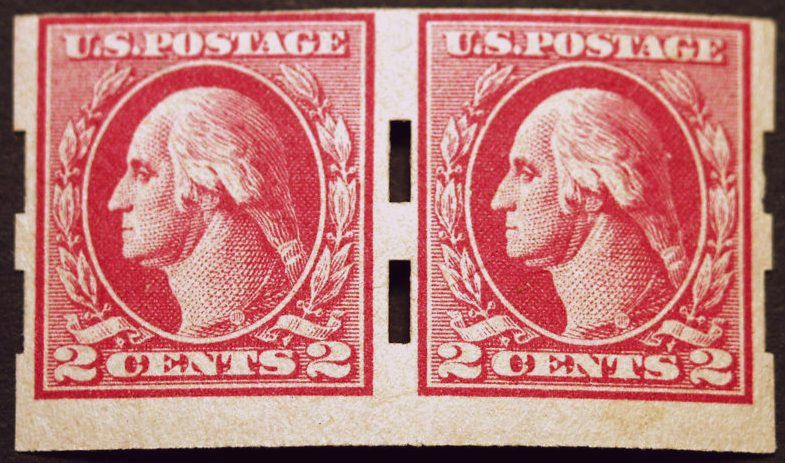
Schermack

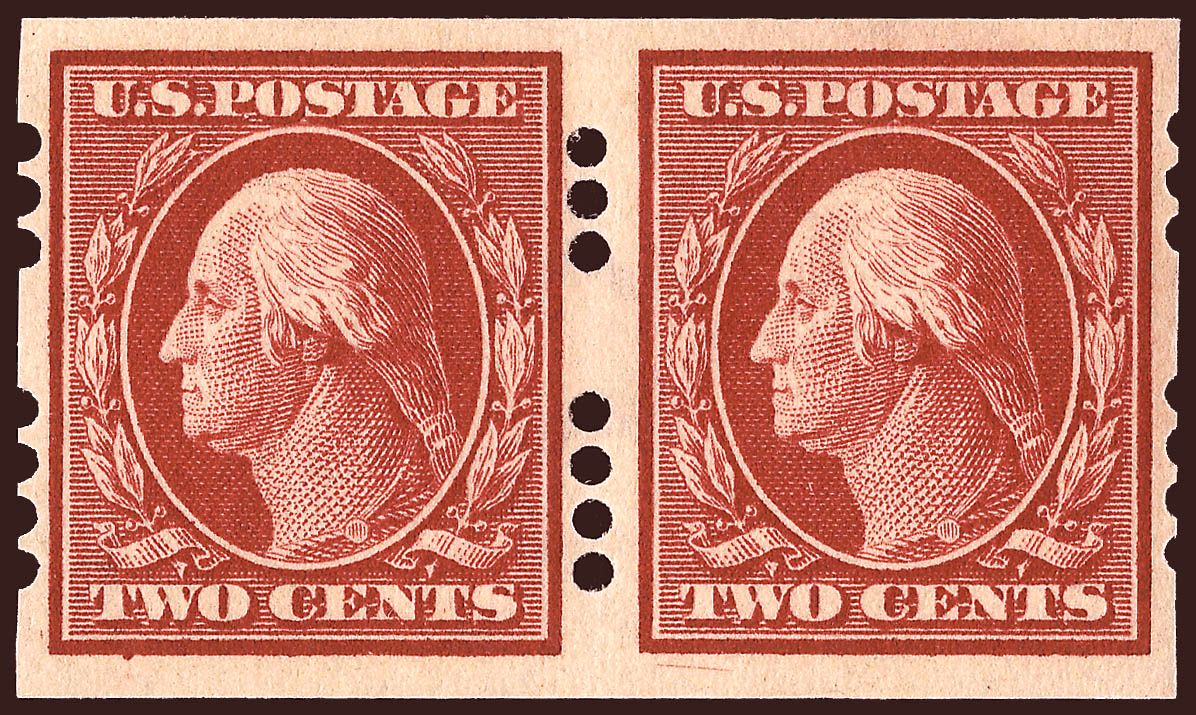
Farwell

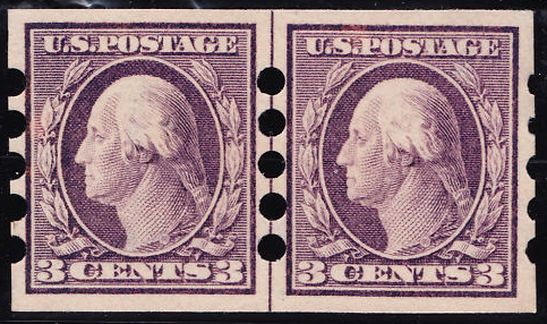
Mail-o-meter

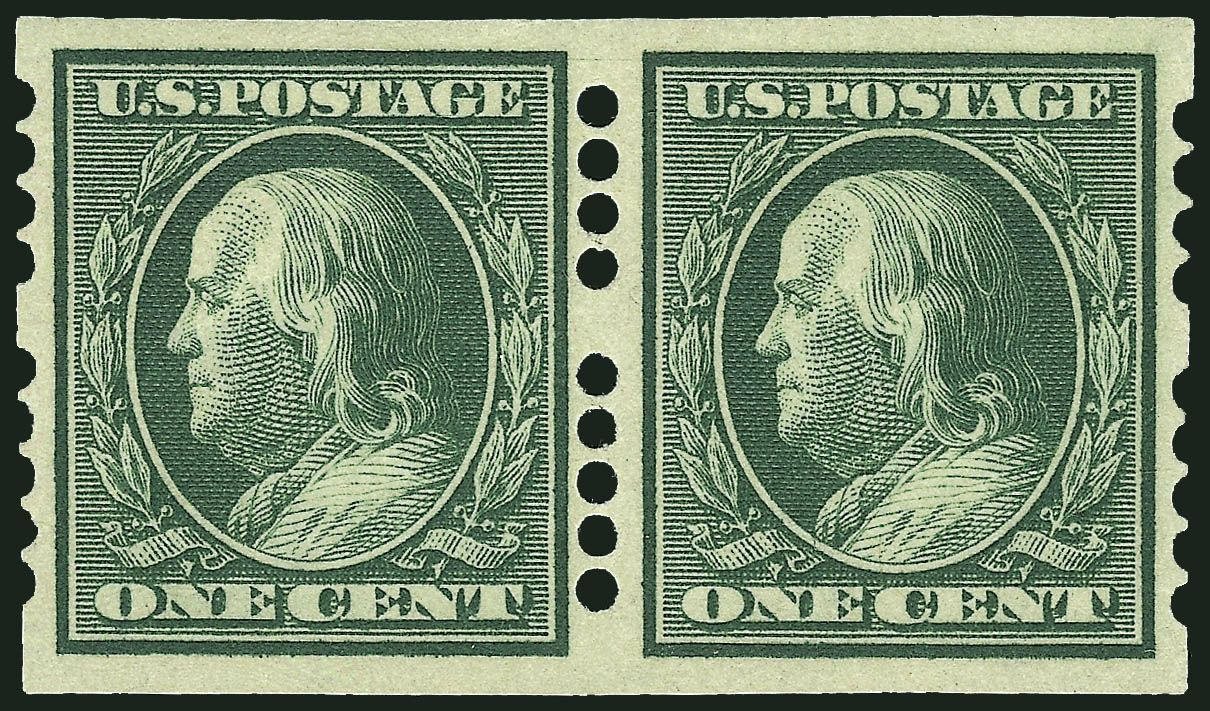
Farwell

== 2- and 3-cent types ==
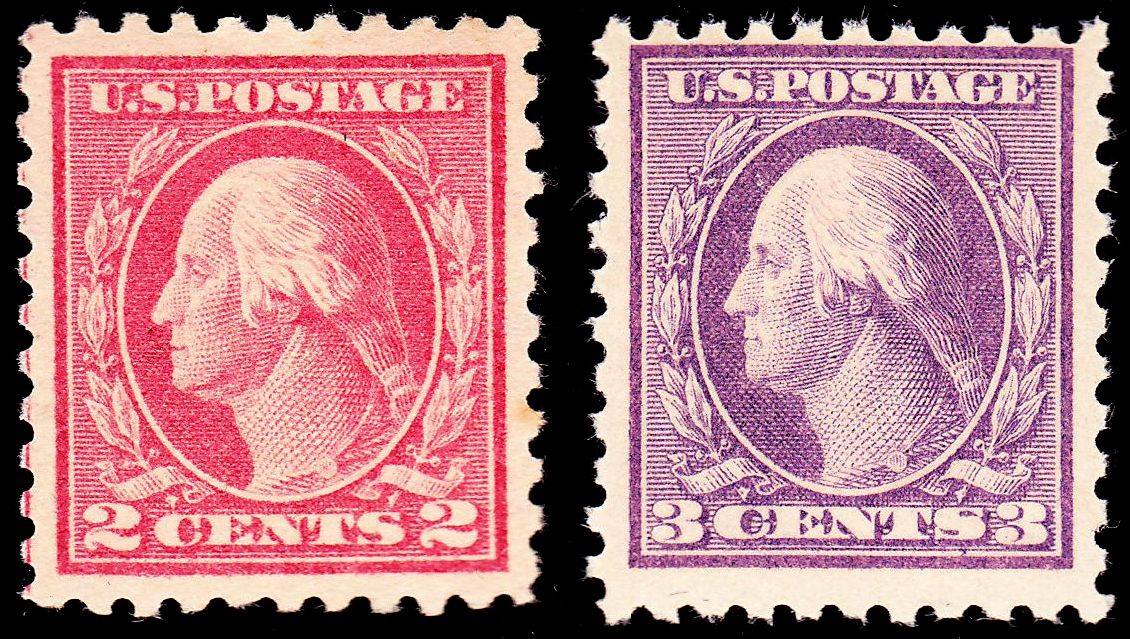
2 and 3 cents varieties

Those engraved images on the 2- and 3-cent Washington-head issues that appear similar but whose lines vary significantly are referred to and often cataloged as types. Type I occurs on flat plate printings only while types II & III also occur mostly in rotary press printings and in offset printings as they were produced from photo plates made from the former printing plates. The 2-cent Type II stamp does not occur on a flat plate stamp. Because the commonly used denominations of the Washington–Franklin issues were printed in greater quantities the worn printing plates would have to be replaced in the process from time to time. Though each new plate was made from the same die transfer, the plates would still differ slightly from the previous plate in use due to the bending process to fit the plate around the rotary press printing cylinder. Plates would also differ because the transfer die itself would wear from repeated image transfers to the printing plate.

There are eleven different types of stamps designs among the two denominations of 2 and 3 cents. The variations that constitute types occur in the various facial features on Washington, and on his Toga and on the various lines of shading on the ornaments of the stamp design. Defining all the various types among these two denominations involves a highly specialized area of study that encompasses a sizable amount of additional information whose many details need accompanying illustrations and as such is beyond the scope of this section. It suffices to say that most of the types are common to less common with only two types that are rare and valuable, one a 2-cent, 1916 issue, type II, the other a 2-cent 1919 issue, type II. Because it requires knowledge of and magnification to see the subtle variations in the lines of the image the valuable stamps can and have gone unnoticed for years before they are ever discovered, and sometimes turn up in common stamp collections, but this is very uncommon as these types are indeed rare. There are various places on-line, one listed in 'External links', 'Identifying the 2 and 3 cent types', that can provide detailed information about the 2c and 3c design types with an assortment of illustrations and charts to aid positive identification. Various publications like the popular Scott Specialized Catalogue of US Stamps also provide detailed and illustrated information for design types.

== Oddities of the Issue ==
There are a few Washington–Franklin issues that were produced at the latter part of their production and can not be categorized with the other series or groups of stamps by their standard features, having features that are not defined by perforation gauge or paper type alone, rendering these issues one of a kind.

- In 1917, the New York Post office returned a batch of imperforate 2-cent stamps from the 1908–09 issue (double-line watermark, "two" spelled out) to Washington for credit. Rather than remitting cash, however, the Federal Post Office in effect transformed these stamps into a new issue by perforating them with the then-current gauge—perforated 11—and returned them to New York. A relative rarity, this issue is catalogued as Scott 519.
- For the first time in the Washington–Franklin issues three stamps were printed with a dual perforation gauge of 11 x 10. Issued June 14, 1919, these 1-, 2-, and 3-cent Washington-heads are the only three stamps in the issue (Scott 538-40) with this particular dual perf. configuration.
- In 1920 a 1-cent Washington-head was issued with perforations of gauge 10 x 11, making it the only stamp in the entire Issue (Scott 542) with this particular configuration and one of only four issues with a compound or dual perforation gauge.
- In 1921 a 1- and 2-cent Washington-head were issued, again on unwatermarked paper with gauge 11 perforations. These two stamps were issued in sheets of 170 and were made from coil waste printed on the rotary press. Images produced from curved printing plates are slightly longer than images produced from a flat plate as the surface and images elongate from the bending. The only way to distinguish this printing from the 1918 perf.11 printing is to measure the parameters of the stamp designs which measure 19½ mm wide by 20 mm tall, or by placing it next to and comparing it with a flat-plate printing.
- In 1923 the Post Office released the last Washington–Franklin stamp that would also become the rarest non-error stamp (Scott 544) in this issue. Printed on unwatermarked paper with gauge 11 perforations, this issue can only be distinguished from the 1-cent 1918 issue (which is also printed on unwatermarked paper with gauge 11 perforations) by measuring the parameters of the design: 19 mm wide by 23½. In 1922 a small quantity of 1c Rotary Press stamps was perforated 11, using remainder sheets from the earlier printings that were normally perforated in 10 gauge or 10 x 11 dual (or compound) gauge. Its existence as a Perf. 11 variety was discovered in 1936, and the stamp finally received a Scott Catalogue listing in 1938.

=== Rare perforation errors ===
When the Post Office changed the perforation gauge from 12 to 10 in 1914, a few sheets emerged with stamps that had been perforated with one of the gauges horizontally and the other vertically (compound perforations). These errors included 1¢, 2¢ and 5¢ stamps (Scott #423A, 423B and 423C) that were perforated 12×10 (12 horizontally and 10 vertically), as well as 1¢ and 2¢ stamps (Scott #423D and 423 E) perforated 10x12. All five varieties are great rarities; indeed the 2¢ perforated 10×12 issue (423E) has been identified as one of the rarest of all U.S. stamps with only a single used copy certified, while the #164 (24c on vertically ribbed paper) is unique. (By comparison, two examples are known of the celebrated 1¢ Z Grill stamp of 1868).

=== The 5-cent color error, 1916–1920 ===
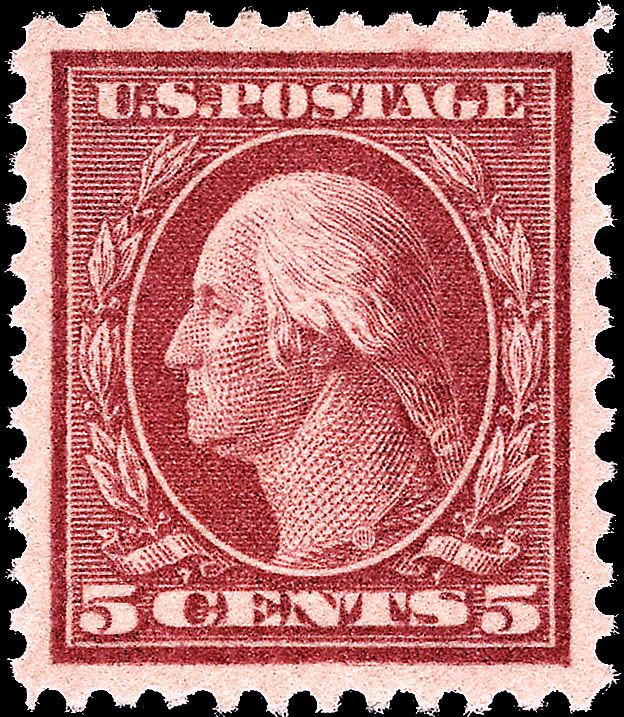
5-cent color error

During the production of the 1916–17 series, it was observed that on one 2-cent plate, No. 7942, three of the 400 images had become noticeably worn. Two of these images were a vertical pair, appearing near the bottom of the top-left pane of 100; the remaining image appeared near the top of the bottom-right pane. When replacing these three images, the technician responsible (conceivably confused by the problems of working with mirror-image material, which can makes a 5 look like a 2) inadvertently transferred 5-cent images onto the three problem positions of the plate. This error was not noticed for several weeks, and eventually three different carmine-colored 5-cent stamps were distributed by the Post Office: the perforated 10 issue of 1916–17 (Scott #467), the imperforate issue of the same years (Scott #485), and the perforated 11 issue of 1917–20 (Scott #505). The imperforate version is by far the rarest of these, and few collectors have ever seen one.

== Watermarks ==
Watermarks occur in paper and are made during the paper making process by means of various devices that impart an impression in the wet paper pulp, the impression usually consisting of an official emblem or letter(s). The actual watermark portion of the paper is thinner than the surrounding paper. The difference in paper thickness can usually be detected by holding the stamp up to a light, however some countries have issued stamps whose watermarks are very difficult to detect in this manner and require watermark detection fluid. Watermarks were originally used by governments for documents, currency and other applications to help prevent counterfeiting. The U.S. Post office began using a double-line watermark bearing the initials USPS in 1895, when the Bureau of Engraving and Printing introduced it into the previously unwatermarked Bureau Triangles stamp issues. The same double-line watermark paper used then was used on the various issues leading up to and used in the production of the 1908 and 1909 versions of the Washington–Franklin issues. In 1910 the watermark was changed to a single-line watermark and with initials which were smaller in size, partly because the double-line watermark tended to weaken the sheets at the perforations causing premature separation of stamps at the Post Office, and partly because postal officials suspected that the double-line watermark caused the stamp paper to shrink unevenly when the sheets dried after printing.

As the Bureau used only two types of watermarks for the Washington–Franklins, with each type bearing the initials USPS, their application is easily summarized. There are eight distinct configurations in which the watermarked initials can appear on any U.S. postage stamp (or sheet), from right side up, to sideways right, to upside down, and to sideways left; and similarly again in reverse form as a result of the sheet of paper being placed reversed in the printing press, thus causing the initials USPS to appear reversed on the stamp/sheet. Watermarks as they occur on U.S. postage stamps are not usually visible to the naked eye and must be submerged in a special watermark fluid that enhances its appearance. This is done to distinguish stamps with the same color, perforation gauge and denomination but which were printed on paper with different watermarks or without any watermarks—i.e., the only way to positively distinguish a 3-cent, 1908 issue, with double-line watermark, from a 3-cent, 1910 issue, with single-line watermark, is to test for these watermarks, as both of these issues are identical in color, denomination and perforation (gauge 12), and therefore cannot be differentiated by these features. (see: WF chart)

The Washington–Franklin issues were the last U.S. stamps to employ papers bearing the USPS watermark; the use of these was discontinued in 1916, during World War I, as a means to reduce expense, as watermarked paper was more expensive than its unwatermarked equivalent and at year's end the difference saved was considerable.

== See also ==
- George Washington on stamps
- Benjamin Franklin on stamps
- Thomas Jefferson on stamps
- Clair Aubrey Huston (designer of Washington–Franklins)
- 1932 Washington Bicentennial
- Presidents of the United States on U.S. postage stamps
- US Regular Issues of 1922–1931
- Postage stamps and postal history of the United States
- Commemorative stamps
- Definitive stamp
- U.S. Postage stamp locator

Preceded by Series of 1902 (Second Bureau Issue)	US Definitive postage stamps 1908–1922	Succeeded by US Regular Issues of 1922–1931 (see also) Fourth Bureau issue

1922–1931 Definitives

Regular (definitive) issues of 1922–1931
Description Dates of Issue	Flat-Plate printing perf.11	Rotary Press printing perf.10	Rotary Press printing perf.11x10½
½-cent, Nathan Hale	551 – Apr.4, 1925	-	653 – May 25, 1929
1-cent, Benjamin Franklin	521 – Jan.17, 1923	581 – Oct.17, 1923	632 – Jun.10, 1927
1½-cent, Warren G. Harding	553 – Mar.19, 1925	582 – Mar.19, 1925	633 – May 17, 1927
2-cents, George Washington	554 – Jan.15, 1923	583 – Apr.14, 1924	634 – Dec.10, 1926
3-cents, Abraham Lincoln	555 – Oct.27, 1922	584 – Aug.1, 1025	625 – Feb.3, 1927
4-cents, Martha Washington	556 – Jun.15, 1923	585 – Apr.4, 1925	636 – May 17, 1927
5-cents, Theodore Roosevelt	557 – Oct.27, 1922	586 – Apr.4, 1925	637 – Mar.24, 1927
6-cents, James Garfield	558 – Nov.20, 1922	587 – Apr.4, 1925	638 – Jul.27, 1927
7-cents, William McKinley	559 – May 1, 1923	588 – May 29, 1926	639 – Mar.24, 1927
8-cents, Ulysses S. Grant	560 – May 1, 1923	589 – May 29, 1926	640 – Jun.10, 1927
9-cents, Thomas Jefferson	561 – Jan.15, 1923	590 – May 29, 1926	641 – May 17, 1927
10-cents, James Monroe	562 – Jan.15, 1923	591 – Jun.8, 1925	642 – Feb.3, 1927
11-cents, Rutherford B. Hayes	563 – Oct.4, 1922	-	692 – Sep.4, 1931
12-cents, Grover Cleveland	564 – May 20, 1923	-	693 – Aug.25, 1931
13-cents, Benjamin Harrison	622 – Jan.11, 1926	-	694 – Sep.4, 1931
14-cent, American Indian	565 – May 1, 1923	-	695 – Sep.8, 1931
15-cents, Statue of Liberty	566 – Nov.11, 1922	-	696 – Aug.27, 1931
17-cents, Woodrow Wilson	623 – Dec.28, 1925	-	697 – Jul.25, 1931
20-cents, Golden Gate	567 – May 1, 1923	-	698 – Sep.8, 1931
25-cents, Niagara Falls	568 – Nov.11, 1922	-	699 – Jul.25, 1931
30-cents, Buffalo	569 – Nov.11, 1922	-	700 – Sep.8, 1931
50-cents, Arlington Amphitheater	570 – Nov.11, 1922	-	701 – Sep.4, 1931
1-dollar, Lincoln Memorial	571 – Feb.12, 1923	-	-
2-dollars, U.S. Capitol	572 – Mar.30, 1923	-	-
5-dollars, Freedom	573 – Mar.30, 1923	-	-

Dates are for day stamp was issued. Numbers for stamp issues from Scotts US Stamp Catalogue.
U.S. stamp locator and NaV-AiD
United States stamp–related categories on Wikimedia Commons:

- History of the United States on stamps
- Presidents of the United States on stamps
- George Washington on stamps
- Thomas Jefferson on stamps
- Benjamin Franklin on stamps
- Andrew Jackson on stamps
- Abraham Lincoln on stamps
- Ulysses S. Grant on stamps
- People of the United States on stamps

- Stamps of the United States
- Commemorative stamps of the United States
- Definitive stamps of the United States
- Airmail stamps of the United States
- Revenue stamps of the United States
- Stamps of the Confederate States of America
- Flags of the United States on stamps
- Stamps of the Confederate States of America
- Stamps of the American Civil War
- Stamps of the Canal Zone

- Stamps of the United States 1860–1869
- Stamps of the United States 1847–1859
- Stamps of the United States 1870–1880
- Stamps of the United States 1881–1890
- Stamps of the United States 1891–1900
- Stamps of the United States 1901–1910
- Stamps of the United States 1911–1920
- Stamps of the United States 1921–1930
- Stamps of the United States 1931–1940
- Stamps of the United States 1941–1950
- Stamps of the United States 1951–1960
- Stamps of the United States 1961–1970
- Stamps of the United States 1971–1977
- Stamps of the United States 1978–1980

- U.S. historical landmarks on stamps
- U.S. territories on stamps

- Stamps designed by Charles R. Chickering
- Stamps designed by Clair Aubrey Houston

General categories on Wikimedia Commons:

(Some of these categories contain images of stamps not issued by the United States.)

- Aircraft on stamps
- Automobiles on stamps
- Birds on stamps
- Buildings on stamps
- Dogs on stamps
- Elephants on stamps
- Horses on stamps
- Maps on stamps
- Sailing ships on stamps
- Ships on stamps
- Trains on stamps
- Red stamps
- Blue stamps
- Brown stamps
- Green stamps
- Purple stamps
- Black stamps
- Yellow stamps
- Orange stamps
- US multi-colored stamps

See also (Wikipedia articles):

- Presidents of the United States on U.S. postage stamps
- Washington–Franklin Issues
- US Regular Issues of 1922–1931

== Bibliography ==
- Armstrong, Martin A., Washington–Franklins 1908–1921, (1979) Trenton Publishing Co., New Jersey, USA
- Smithsonian National Postal Museum, Archives, Collections and Exhibits.
- Scotts Specialized Catalogue of United States Stamps, 1982, Scott Publishing Company,
  New York, N.Y. ISBN 978-0-89487-042-2; Library of Congress Card No. 2-3301
- Kenmore Collectors Catalog, 2010 Winter edition, Catalog #906, p 37–41,
