= Series of 1902 (United States postage stamps) =

The Series of 1902, also known as the Second Bureau Issue, is a set of definitive postage stamps in fourteen denominations ranging between one cent and five dollars, produced by the U. S. Bureau of Engraving and Printing and issued by the United States Post Office. Two denominations appeared in November and December 1902 and the other twelve were released between January and June 1903. These stamps were assigned the Scott Catalogue numbers 300 through 313. Also considered part of the series is a fifteenth stamp which appeared in November 1903—a second version of the 2¢ value (Scott #319), the original having faced severe criticism. This series, particularly noted for its exceptional ornateness and opulence of design, remained in circulation until late 1908, when it was superseded by the Washington-Franklin Issues.

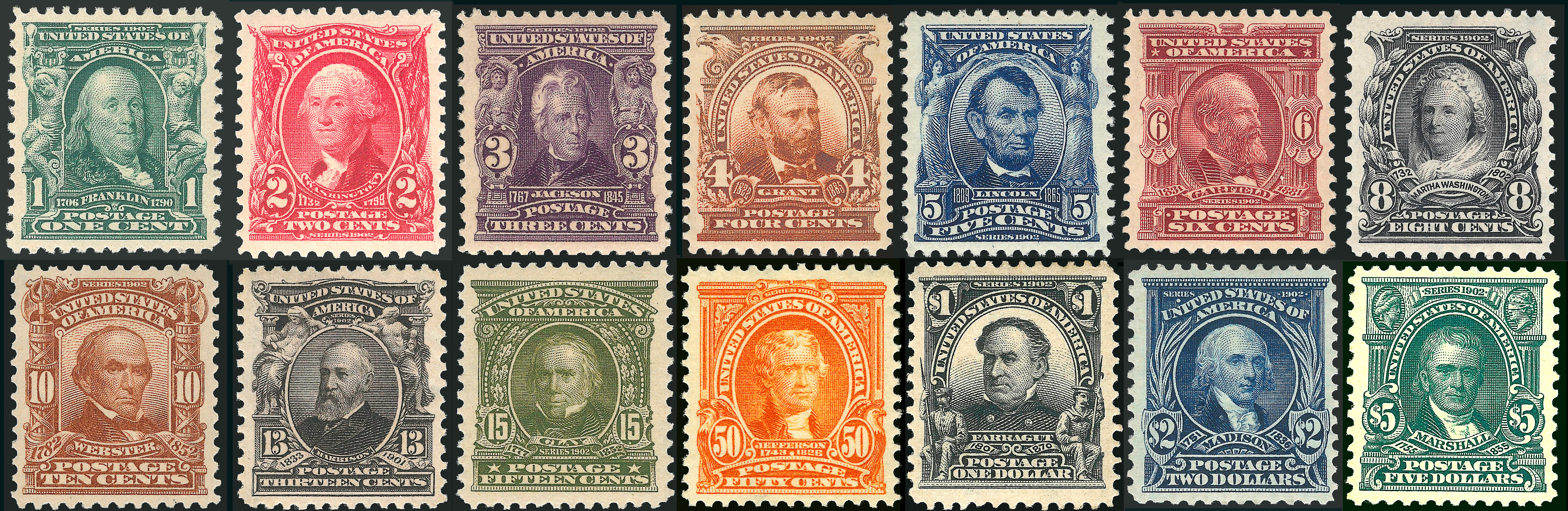
Series of 1902

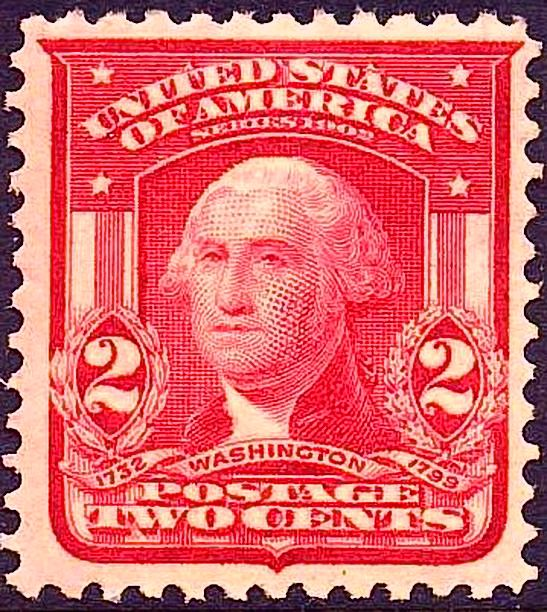
Issue of 1903

== Design and production ==
Despite its name, the Second Bureau Issue was, in fact, the first definitive series designed exclusively by the Bureau of Engraving and Printing. For its first issue (1894), the Bureau had not had sufficient time to produce new images, and so, chose to retain the existing stamp designs produced by the American Banknote Company for the 1890 series, modifying these only slightly by adding triangles in the upper corners of the stamps. Only four years later did the Bureau's postage stamp unit have the opportunity to prove that it was capable of something more than this utilitarian effort, when the Post Office elected to issue a commemorative set in honor of the Trans-Mississippi Exposition. The resulting Trans-Mississippi Issue remains one of the most admired of all U. S. Stamp sets, designed in an elaborate and flamboyant visual style surely intended to demonstrate that the Bureau could attain an unimpeachably high level of engraving creativity and craftsmanship. The Bureau aimed at similar sumptuousness in its next commemorative series, the 1901 Pan-American Exposition Issue, and this artistic approach then came to U. S. definitive stamps with the Series of 1902. The style of these three series reflects a wider phenomenon found in the turn-of-the-twentieth-century American arts: a ubiquitous embrace of the profusely ornamental Beaux-Arts style offered by the "White City" complex erected at the Columbian Exposition in Chicago in 1893.

Post Office officials, in fact, had been so pleased with the Pan-American Issue that they were eager to produce a new definitive issue that would publicize their efforts, and in February 1902 instructed the Bureau "to employ special pains to produce a series particularly attractive and distinctive, and fully as creditable as the Pan-American." The result of these "special pains" was a series that, unusual for a definitive set, employed a different and highly individual design for each stamp (by contrast, a uniform design plan had governed all the stamps of the preceding First Bureau Issue). The visual imagery of the 1902 designs, replete with suggestions of architectural features such as caryatids, friezes, plinths, marble columns etc. (many of them iconographically suited to the persons portrayed), was paralleled by an equally eclectic approach to typography, several different fonts being employed for letters and numerals, and several different styles of curvature being applied to some text. One notable feature of the designs is the tendency of pictorial details to protrude into left and right borders of the stamps: the arms, knees or robes of allegorical statues, the tops of flagstaffs, the beaks of eagles, the shields enclosing the numerals—even a sailor's grappling hook and a marine's musket. All fourteen original designs were the work of Raymond Ostrander Smith, whose designs for the Pan-American series and the Trans-Mississippi Issue had won much acclaim. For the first time in a definitive set, the birth and death dates of the famous Americans depicted appeared flanking their images, a feature that would remain more common in commemorative issues. The legend "Series 1902" was printed near the top or bottom of all the stamps, even though only two of them were released in that year. (It likewise appeared on the replacement of the 2¢ value, which was not even designed until the following year.) This dating practice was carried over from the Pan-American set, the stamps of which had all similarly identified themselves as "Commemorative Series 1901." It continued in the Special Delivery stamp of 1902 as well as the Post Office's next two commemorative releases—the Louisiana Purchase Commemorative Issue (1904) and the Jamestown Exposition Issue (1907)—but was subsequently abandoned.

Closer to 19th century tradition in the series of 1902 was its pantheon of celebrated Americans. Nine of the values—the 1¢, 2¢, 3¢, 6¢, 10¢, 15¢, 50¢, $2 and $5—depicted the same statesmen who had appeared on the corresponding denominations of the First Bureau Series. Moreover, on the 4¢ and 5¢ stamps, Lincoln and Grant merely exchanged their previous roles. Only three new subjects were chosen, but one of them represented a feminist breakthrough: Martha Washington, appearing on the 8¢ value, became the first woman ever featured on a U. S. definitive stamp, an innovation publicized well in advance. (That denomination had belonged to General William Tecumseh Sherman in both the First Bureau Issue and the American Banknote series that preceded it.) The recently deceased Benjamin Harrison graced the 13¢ value—the first 13¢ stamp ever offered by the U. S. Post Office; while the $1 denomination, which had been devoted to Oliver Perry in the First Bureau Series, was now reassigned to a more recent naval hero, Admiral David Farragut. The Harrison issue was the first stamp of the Second Bureau Series to be released, on November 18, 1902, and the 8¢ Martha Washington followed on December 6.

Also continued in the Series of 1902 was the use of the Universal Postal Union colors required of all member nations on stamps for post cards (green, 1¢), regular mail (red, 2¢) and international mail (blue, 5¢). These were meant to facilitate the easy handling of international mail and had been adopted for the final version of the First Bureau Issue in 1898. Of the eleven remaining 1902 denominations, ten appeared in colors identical—or nearly identical—to those of their 1898 counterparts: only the 8¢ stamp was significantly different in hue.

The oft-unusual iconography with which this series evokes the achievements of its famous Americans includes the following: for Franklin's electrical researches, lightbulbs in the stamp's top corners; for Grant's military exploits, eagles and flags; for Lincoln's reunification of North and South, female figures clasping U. S. flags and holding merged palm fronds above the President's head; for Webster's congressional coalition-building, fasces; for Farragut's naval campaigns, a marine and a sailor; for Harrison's educational initiatives, muses of learning (one reading a book, one sculpting a child); for Marshall's jurisprudence, bas-relief goddesses of Liberty and blindfolded Justice. (Iconography had been almost entirely excluded from previous U. S. definitive issues. On only two stamps, both in the large banknote designs introduced in 1870, had portraits of famous Americans—General Winfield Scott and Admiral Oliver Perry—been accompanied by images suggesting their accomplishments.)

While the BEP clearly aimed at a reputation for uncommon excellence with the Series of 1902, this hope went unrealized. The stamp intended for widest circulation, the 2¢ Washington normal-letter-rate value, prompted numerous objections upon its release in January 1903: the image of our first president was thought too weak, failing to reflect his iconic heroism. Indeed, according to Max Johl, fine details that showed particularly well in the black-ink die proof of the stamp on India paper were fatally compromised "when the stamps were printed on the regular stamp paper by fast presses [in] red ink" resulting in "a very mediocre effect." The New York Sun observed that this inking problem "gave Washington the nose of a toper." Within two months, the Post Office had decided to replace this so-called Washington "flag" stamp, and in November 1903 it offered a new Washington "shield" issue, which met greater favor. (By this time, Raymond Ostrander Smith had left the BEP, and the replacement was designed by Clair Aubrey Huston.) Nor did the 1¢ stamp go unscathed on its release. The New York Times responded with a withering sarcasm:

The artist employed by the concern which furnishes our Government with stamps is supposed to have won the first booby prize with the design for the new red two-cent stamp; alas, he can claim the second only; the new green one-cent stamp had not made its appearance…. The new one-cent stamp, in the vernacular of Chatham square and the Bowery, is a peach…. Lest there should be a mistake made by some one unfamiliar with Benjamin Franklin's visage the name Franklin and the dates of his birth and death are thoughtfully inscribed. Flat-faced, long-nosed, miserable, is the mask of that jovial philosopher as Uncle Sam's one-cent stamp depicts him. Not content with names and dates, the designer has added certain touches of "high art" which will make other nations split with envy. Who ever thought of putting full-length caryatids, and caryatids of the male sex on a postal stamp! Here on our lovely green stamp two nude boys are writhing in the assorted poses of malefactors condemned to the cross by the sides of Benny Franklin's doleful phiz…. Someone must have had the inspiration for this lovely design. He should be dragged from an obscurity which too often covers Genius, and at the next congress of Philatelists should be placed on a high stool and crowned with that tiara which in early days was reserved for such as he.

But a problem more serious than press sniping plagued the Series of 1902: that the existing technique of stamp production could not ensure the quality control needed to present designs of this opulence to best advantage. For, one result of cramming so much detail into the stamps was that the images were larger than usual, leaving little white space at their edges. This defect magnified an endemic problem of stamp production at that time: that many stamps emerged from the perforation machines with the design seriously off-center. Lopsided examples of these stamps with portions of the images cut off are all too common; and relatively few collectors have succeeded in assembling a complete set of the 1902 series in which all the denominations are well-centered.

These issues, like all previous U. S. postage stamps produced since 1861, were "perforated 12" according to the standard gauge (i. e., twelve holes in a two-centimeter span). In another continued practice, the 1902 stamps were printed on a special paper embedded with watermarks reading "U S P S" in double-lined letters. This paper, a forgery-detection device, had been introduced into the First Bureau Issue in 1895, a year after its first release, following the appearance of fair-quality counterfeits of the 1894 2¢ stamp. The double-line watermark remained in use until 1910.

The Washington-Franklin Issues which gradually replaced the 1902 stamps beginning in late 1908 represented a drastic stylistic reaction to the profusion and variety of elaborate ornament marking their predecessors. All the stamps of the new series essentially conformed to a uniform design plan. The Series of 1902 circulated for only six years. By comparison, the stamp images previously available, many originally produced for the 1890 issue and modified in the First Bureau Series, had remained on sale for as long as twelve years, while the subsequent Washington-Franklin Issues would survive for almost fifteen years.

== Reprints of the higher denominations ==
The initial issue of the Washington-Franklin stamps in 1908-1909 comprised only twelve denominations, with a top value of $1. Supplies of $2 and $5 stamps from the Series of 1902 at post offices were then so ample that there seemed no point in issuing replacements. Indeed, stocks remained adequate until early 1917, when a sudden increase of parcels sent from the U. S. to revolution-wracked Russia greatly swelled the demand for these high denominations. As the public needed $2 and $5 stamps immediately, the Post Office elected to reprint the 1902 designs of the two issues as a stop-gap, until such time as Washington-Franklin versions could be produced. The reprints (Scott nos. 479–480) went on sale on March 22, 1917; new Franklin $2 and $5 stamps (Scott nos. 523-524) became available only on August 19 of the following year.

The two reissues are easily distinguishable from the 1903 originals because by then the Bureau had determined that perforated 12 stamps separated too easily to withstand normal handling in post offices, and so, a coarser gauge, perforated 10, was used for the 1917 issues. Moreover, the new versions, like all the stamps of that year, were produced on unwatermarked paper. The reprints are considerably less costly to collectors than the originals (particularly the $5, which is almost ten times as expensive in the 1902 version).

== Experimental variants of the issue ==
=== Booklets ===
In 1900 the Post Office for the first time had offered stamps in booklets. These each contained 2¢ stamps from the First Bureau Series configured in panes of six. One booklet had two panes, another was offered with four, and the third with eight. In preparing the Series of 1902, 2¢-booklet production figured in the Post Office’s earliest plans. Accordingly, the Washington "flag" stamp booklets of two, four, or eight panes went on sale only a week after the sheet version appeared, on January 24, 1903. In the case of the 2¢ "shield" replacement, the booklet followed the sheet by three weeks.

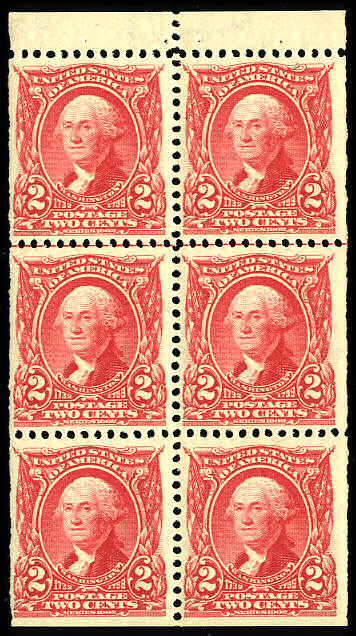
2¢ "flag" stamp booklet pane

Booklet production required separate printing plates containing 180 images (the normal plates for sheets of lower-valued stamps contained 400 examples; for denominations of 50¢ and higher, plates of 200 images were employed). The Post office did not at first consider booklets of the 1¢ stamp necessary, but eventually decided after all to prepare plates for a 1¢ Franklin booklet, which appeared on March 1, 1907. As shown in the illustration, stamps from a booklet pane of this issue differ in the way they are perforated, with two stamps imperforate on the left side only and two imperforate on the right side only, while the bottom two stamps have imperforate corners (bottom and left; bottom and right).

=== Imperforate stamps and coils ===
The early years of the 20th Century saw the development of technologically and commercially viable stamp-vending and stamp-affixing machines; and this phenomenon had important effects upon methods by which several stamps in the 1902 series were produced--particularly as regards perforation. Because it proved impossible to devise machines that could reliably handle the 100-stamp panes of perforated stamps normally offered by the Post Office, vending manufacturers asked the Post Office instead for imperforate sheets of 400, which they would then cut into strips and incise with special types of private perforations that were more easily handled by machine. Accordingly, the Post Office produced imperforate versions of the 1¢ and 2¢ stamps (both released in October 1906), with imperforate 4¢ and 5¢ stamps following in 1908. (These were the first imperforate postage stamps issued by the U. S. since 1856.) Also in 1908, the Post Office experimented with issuing coil strips of 1¢, 2¢ and 5¢ stamps for use in selected vending machines. The 5¢ issue appeared only in "vertical coils" (i. e., the coil was a single stamp wide, each stamp was imperforate on both its left and right sides, while perforations separated the bottom of each stamp from the top of the one below it); the 1¢ and 2¢ values, however were each offered both as "vertical coils" and "horizontal coils" (stamps side-to-side separated by perforations, imperforate top and bottom).

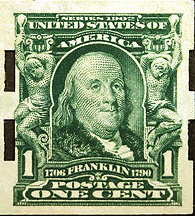
1¢ stamp with Schermack "hyphen-hole" perforations

For two reasons, these 1908 coils stand among the great rarities of philately: first because relatively small numbers of them were produced in the few months before the 1902 series was withdrawn from sale; second because coils were so novel a phenomenon that philatelists and stamp dealers did not yet recognize them as separate collectible varieties and so, made no effort to acquire them (surely some stamps were discarded that collectors and dealers might have preserved a year or two later). Even the most common of the 1908 coils, the 2¢ horizontal variety, fetches at least $2,500 U. S., and all the others are considerably more valuable, with the inordinately scarce 1¢ vertical coil cataloguing at above $100,000 and the even rarer 2¢ vertical coil valued at perhaps five times that much. With one exception, all of these coil and imperforate versions received separate Scott Catalogue numbers (314-318;320-322).

The exception, the 4¢ imperforate value, is a particularly notable rarity, because no copies of the stamp in its originally-issued imperforate form survive. All of these 4¢ issues were incised with private "hyphen-hole" perforations by the Schermack company, and examples of them can fetch upwards of $50,000. Perhaps because the stamp no longer exists as released, Scott did not assign it a separate number, but listed it as #314A (#314 belongs to the 1¢ imperforate version). The 1¢, 2¢ and 5¢ imperforate stamps exist with a variety of private perforations produced by five companies: Schermack, U. S. Automatic Vending, Brinkerhoff (1¢ and 2¢ only), Mail-O-Meter (2¢ only) and International Vending Machine (2¢ only).

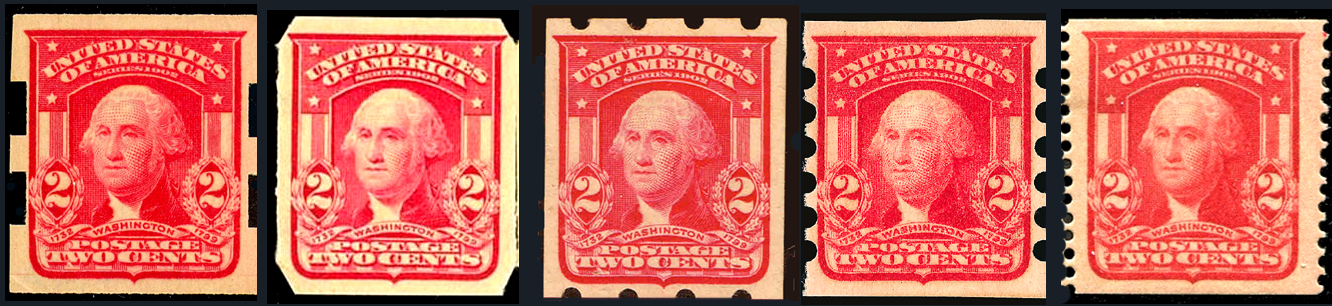
Private perforations (L-R): Schermack, US Auto Vending, Brinkerhoff, Mail-O-Meter, International Vending Machine

== The individual stamps ==
- 1¢ Green, Benjamin Franklin, issued February 3, 1903, designed by Raymond Ostrander Smith. From a painting by James B. Longacre. The engravers were George F. C. Smillie (portrait and flanking sculptural male figures holding lightbulbs aloft), Robert F. Ponickau (frame) and Lyman F. Ellis (lettering and numerals). The imperforate version appeared on October 2, 1906, booklets of six 1¢ stamps were issued on March 1, 1907, the vertical coil was released on February 2, 1908, followed by the horizontal coil on July 31, 1908.
- 2¢ Carmine, George Washington—original version, known as the "flag"—issued January 17, 1903, designed by Raymond Ostrander Smith. From a painting by Gilbert Stuart. The portrait was engraved by George F. C. Smillie, the ornamental framework by Robert F. Ponickau, the lettering by Lyman F. Ellis. The booklet of six appeared on January 24, 1903.
- 2¢ Carmine, George Washington—second version, known as the "shield"—issued November 12, 1903, designed by Clair Aubrey Huston. From a painting by Gilbert Stuart. Engraving by George F. C. Smillie (portrait), Robert F. Ponickau (frame) and George Rose (lettering). The booklet of six appeared on December 7, 1903. Imperforate version issued October 2, 1906; vertical coil on February 18, 1908; horizontal coil on July 31, 1908.
- 3¢ Purple, Andrew Jackson, issued February 11, 1903, designed by Raymond Ostrander Smith. After a painting by Thomas Sully. Engraving by George F. C. Smillie (portrait and flanking sculptural male figures), Robert F. Ponickau (frame), with lettering and numerals engraved by George Rose, Lyman F. Ellis and Edward M. Weeks.
- 4¢ Brown, Ulysses S. Grant, issued February 3, 1903, designed by Raymond Ostrander Smith. From a ferrotype portrait by William Kurtz. Engraving by George F. C. Smillie (portrait), Robert F. Ponickau (frame), and George Rose and Lyman F. Ellis (lettering). Imperforate version issued May 15, 1908 and all surviving copies have Schermack Type III hyphen-hole perforations on one or both sides.
- 5¢ Blue, Abraham Lincoln, issued January 20, 1903, designed by Raymond Ostrander Smith After a photograph by Mathew Brady. Engraving by Marcus W. Baldwin (portrait and flanking sculptural female figures), Robert F. Ponickau (frame) and George Rose and Lyman F. Ellis (lettering). Imperforate version issued May 30, 1908; vertical coil on February 24, 1908.
- 6¢ Brown-red, James Garfield, issued February 20, 1903, designed by Raymond Ostrander Smith. After an unidentified photograph. Engravers: portrait, Marcus W. Baldwin and George F. C. Smillie; frame, Robert F. Ponickau; lettering, George Rose and Lyman F. Ellis.
- 8¢ Originally pale lavender, later dark lavender or black, Martha Washington, issued December 6, 1902, designed by Raymond Ostrander Smith. After a portrait by Gilbert Stuart. Engravers: George F. C. Smillie (portrait), Robert F. Ponickau (frame) and George Rose (lettering).
- 10¢ Pale red-brown, Daniel Webster, issued February 5, 1903, designed by Raymond Ostrander Smith. After a daguerreotype by John Adams Whipple. Engravers: Marcus W. Baldwin (portrait), Robert F. Ponickau (frame), George Rose and Lyman F. Ellis (lettering).
- 13¢ Brownish-purple, Benjamin Harrison, issued November 18, 1902, designed by Raymond Ostrander Smith. After a photograph supplied by Mrs. Harrison. Engravers: Marcus W. Baldwin (portrait and frame) and Lyman F. Ellis (lettering).
- 15¢ Olive-green, Henry Clay, issued May 27, 1903, designed by Raymond Ostrander Smith. From an engraving by Alfred Sealy. Engravers: Marcus W. Baldwin (portrait), Robert F. Ponickau (frame), George Rose and Lyman F. Ellis (lettering).
- 50¢ Orange, Thomas Jefferson, issued March 23, 1903, designed by Raymond Ostrander Smith. After a painting by Gilbert Stuart. Engravers: George F. C. Smillie (portrait), Robert F. Ponickau (frame) and George Rose (lettering).
- $1 Black, Admiral David Farragut, issued June 5, 1903, designed by Raymond Ostrander Smith. After an engraving by Charles Schlecht. Engravers: George F.C. Smillie (portrait), Marcus W. Baldwin (flanking seated marine with musket and sailor with grappling hook) Robert F. Ponickau (frame), and George Rose (lettering).
- $2 Blue, James Madison, issued June 5, 1903, designed by Raymond Ostrander Smith. After a painting by Gilbert Stuart. Engravers: George F. C. Smillie (portrait), Robert F. Ponickau (frame), Lyman F. Ellis and George Rose (lettering). Reprint (Perforated 10, unwatermarked) issued March 22, 1917.
- $5 Green, John Marshall, issued June 5, 1903, designed by Raymond Ostrander Smith. After a painting by William James Hubard. Engravers: George F. C. Smillie (portrait), Marcus W. Baldwin (allegorical female heads of Liberty [top left] and Justice [top right, blindfolded]), Robert F. Ponickau (frame) and Lyman F. Ellis (lettering). Reprint (Perforated 10, unwatermarked) issued March 22, 1917.

== See also ==
- Pan-American invert
- Postage stamps and postal history of the United States
- Regular Issues of 1921-1931
- Trans-Mississippi Issue
- U.S. Special Delivery (postal service) which has stamps engraved "Series 1902"
- Washington-Franklin Issues

Preceded by First Bureau Issue, Third Version (new UPU Colors), 1898	US Definitive postage stamps 1902 - 1908	Succeeded by Washington-Franklin Issues
