= Clair Aubrey Huston =

American postage stamp designer

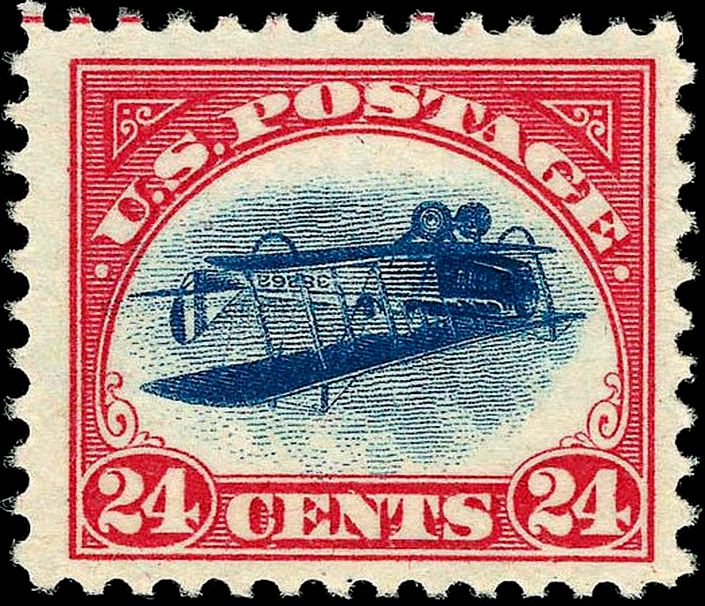
Inverted Jenny, famous error Designed by Clair Aubrey Huston, (Note: Huston did not intend for the plane to be inverted, which was a printing error.) Issue of 1918 (Huston designed the stamp with the airplane upright)

Clare Aubrey Huston (a.k.a. Charles Aubrey Huston, December 1, 1857-March 4, 1938) was chief postage stamp designer at the United States Bureau of Engraving and Printing (BEP) early in the 20th century. He was the great-grandson of Michael Leib (1759–1822), an American physician and politician. Huston worked at the BEP for more than 21 years and was the designer of numerous United States postage issues.

== Philatelic career ==
Entire series of United States stamp issues were designed by Huston, including the Washington-Franklins and the Regular Issues of 1922. Huston often used paintings and sculptures of famous American artists like Gilbert Stuart as models for his stamp designs. One of the postage issues Huston is most noted for is the 24 cent Curtis Jenny airmail stamp of 1918, whose image became famous when the biplane was printed upside down. In another aeronautical design, six years earlier Huston had pictured an airplane on the 20 cent parcel post issue. This was the first postage stamp in the world to depict such a machine.

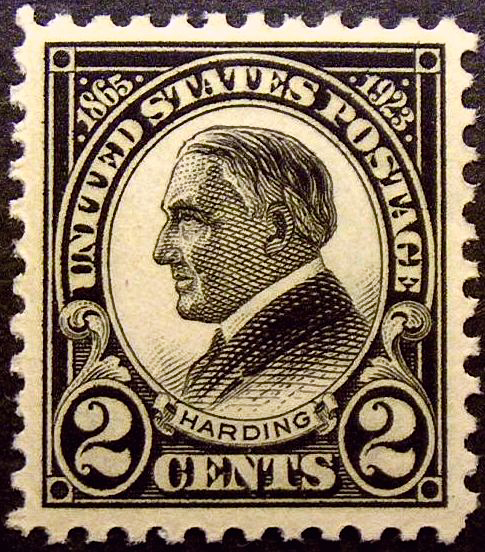
Warren G. Harding memorial issue of 1923

Huston is also noted for designing the Warren G. Harding memorial issue of 1923, which he designed in one day using a modified version of the Fourth Bureau Issue frame and a copperplate etching of the late Harding. The prompt and speedy production of the Harding memorial issue was the result of overwhelming public pressure and the stamp was issued only a month after the late President Harding's passing, a record for U.S. postal history that has never since been broken.

The first Huston design issued by the Post Office was the 2-cent Washington "shield" stamp offered in November 1903. This was a replacement for the much criticized Washington "flag" stamp from the definitive series of 1902, designed by Raymond Ostrander Smith (who had since left the Bureau of Engraving and Printing). The public welcomed the replacement, and the Louisiana Purchase Exposition commemoratives, a series of five stamps designed by Huston, went on sale the following year.

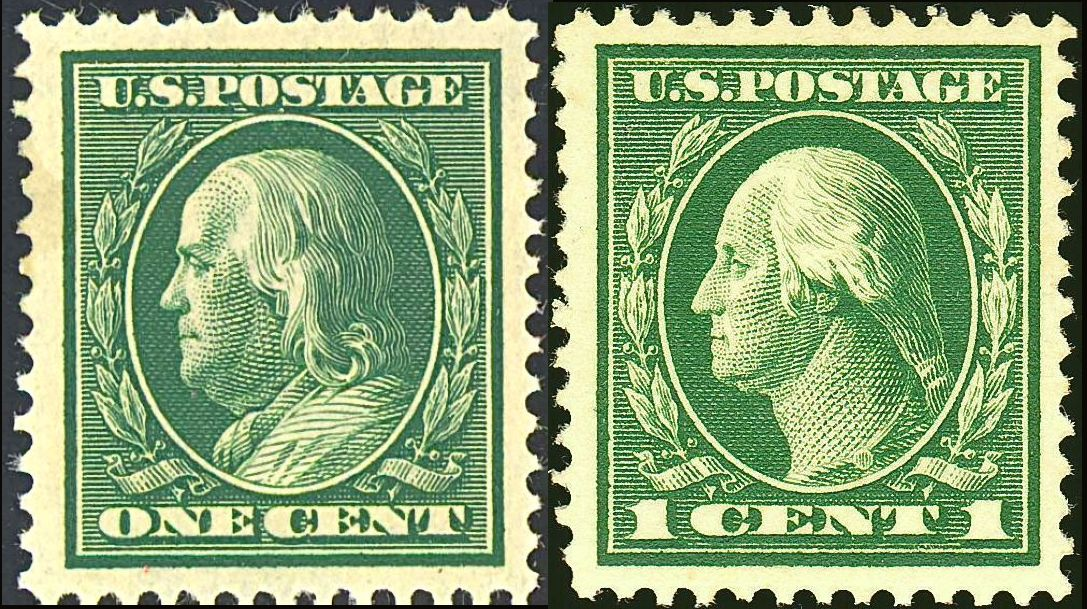
Washington-Franklin design used on issues of 1908–1922

Huston designed the long running Washington-Franklin Issues, a series of definitive stamps bearing the profiles of George Washington and Benjamin Franklin. These issues remained in print longer than any other series of stamps to date. Huston was also the principal designer of the US Regular Issues of 1922–1931.

Dozens of United States postage stamp designs were created by Huston. Besides designing the world-famous Curtis Jenny airmail stamp, Huston is credited for designing the Founding of Jamestown issues, the Abraham Lincoln and Ulysses S. Grant regular issues of the 1920s, the Huguenot Walloon commemorative issues of 1924, The Pilgrim Tercentenary of 1920 and the American Indian regular issue of 1923. The Washington-Franklin Issues and his seven contributions to the 1932 Washington Bicentennial Issue are among his more famous designs.

== Huston's stamp designs ==
U.S. Parcel Post stamps of 1912–13

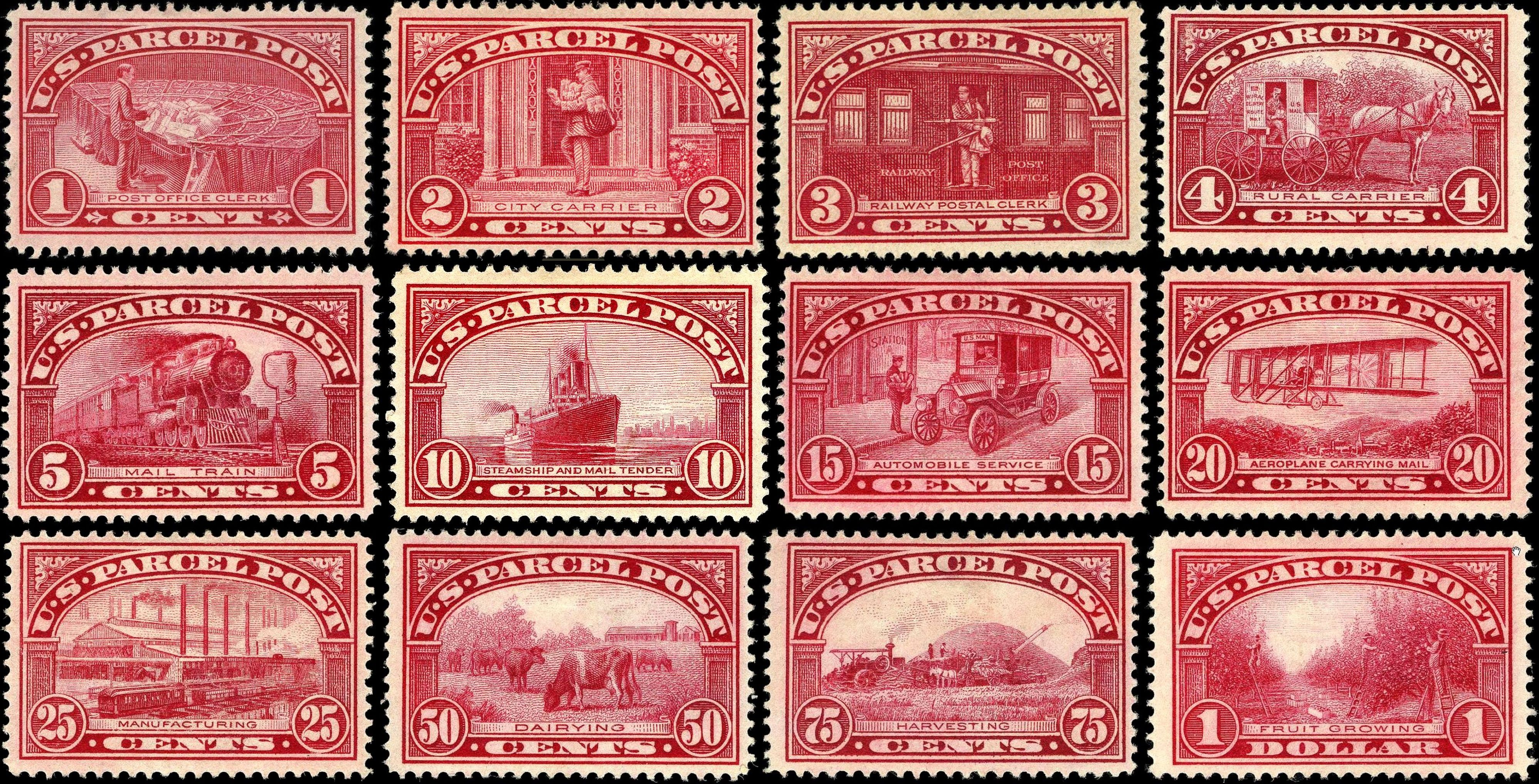
First Parcel Post stamps issued by the U.S. Post Office, 1912–13

Washington-Franklin Issues

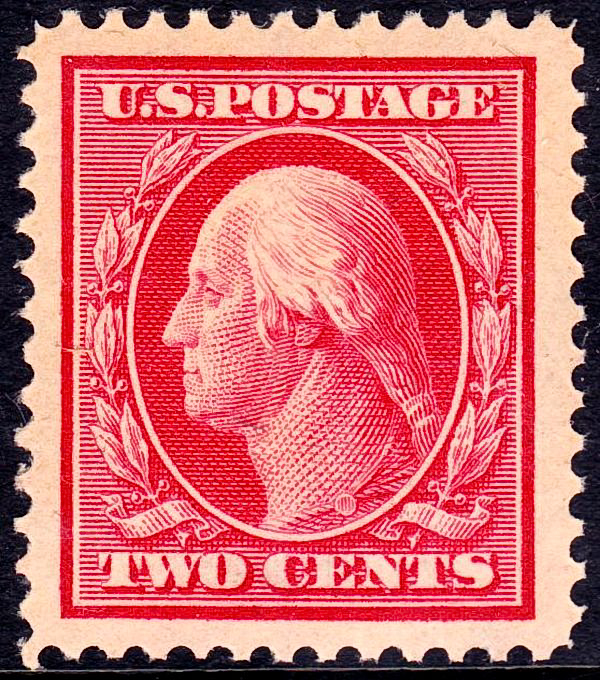
Issue of 1908

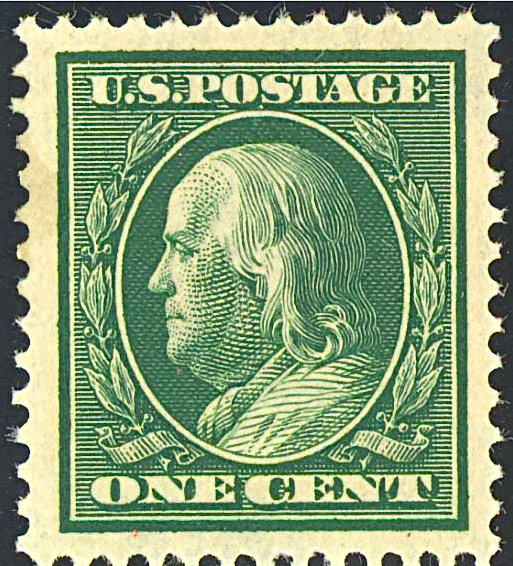
Issue of 1908

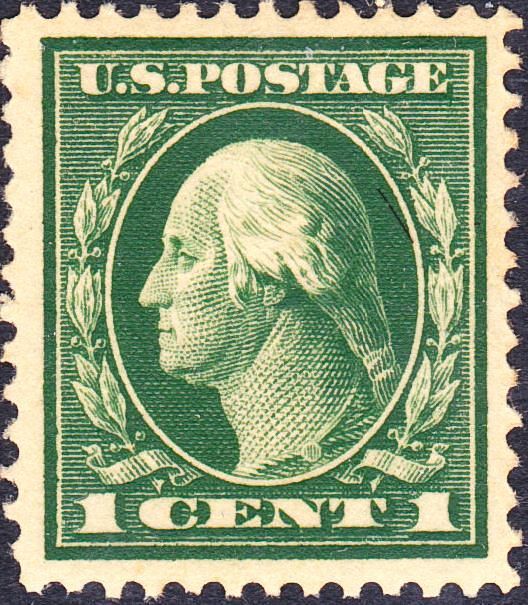
Issue of 1912

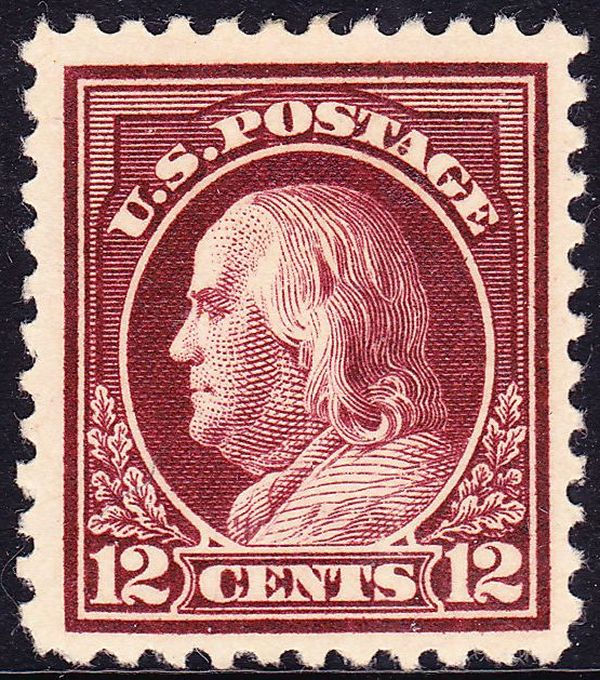
Issue of 1917

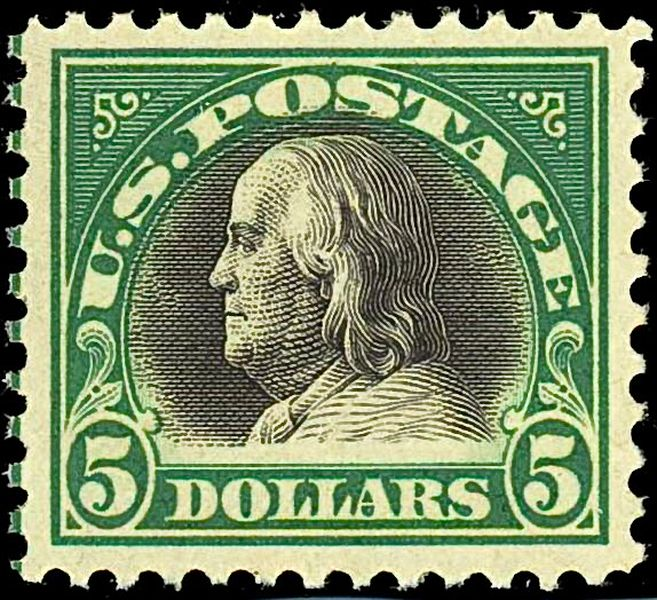
Issue of 1918

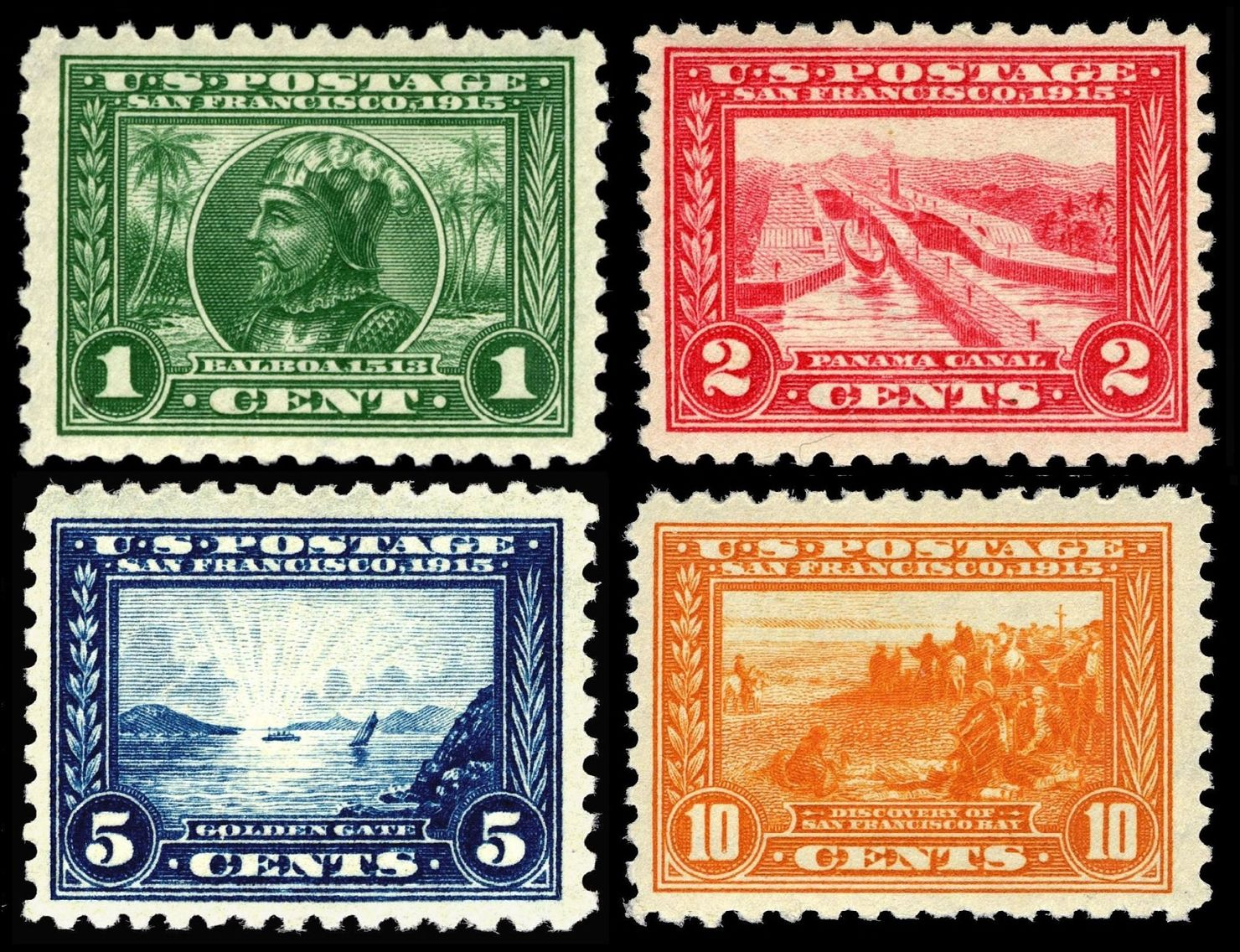
Panama-Pacific Issues of 1913/1915

Regular Issues of 1922–1931

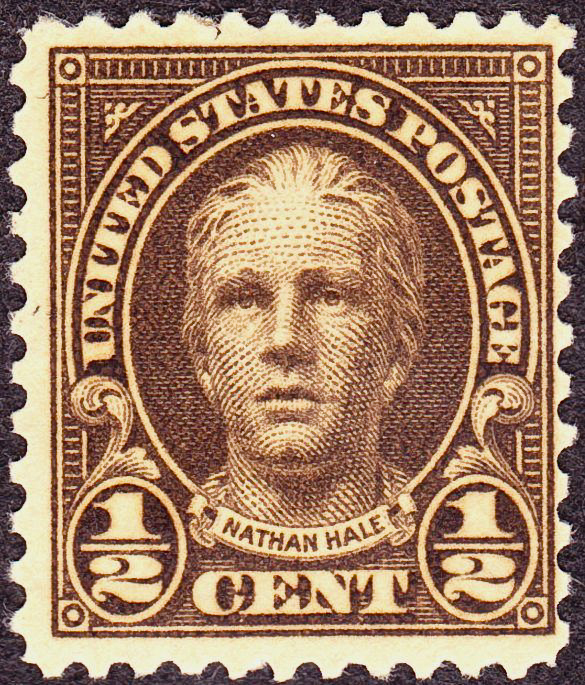
Nathan Hale

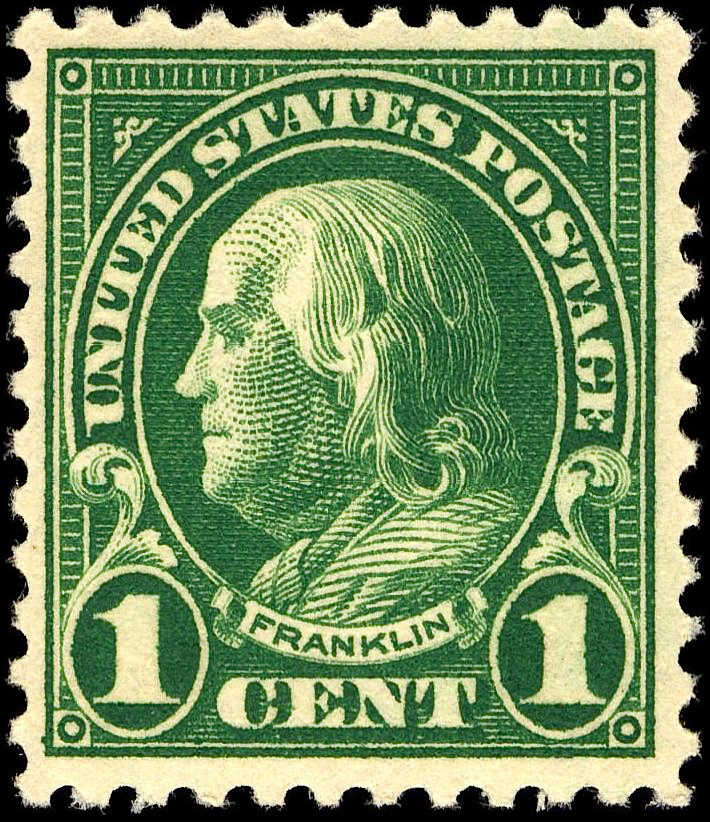
Benjamin Franklin

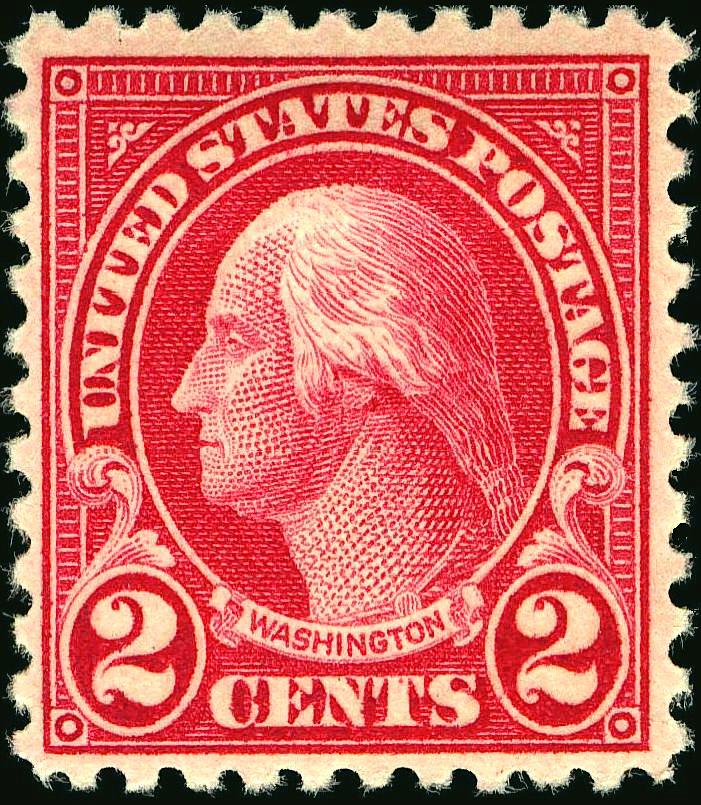
George Washington

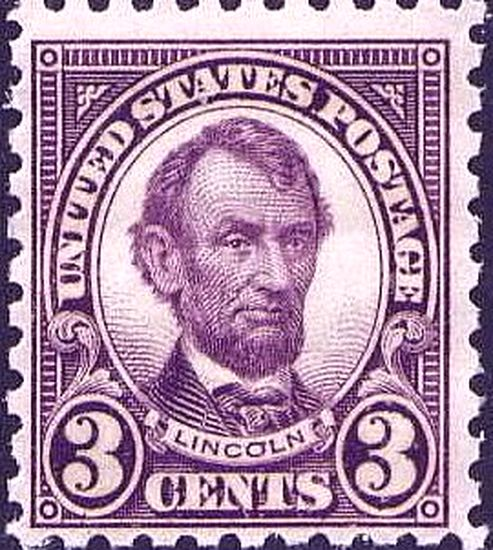
Abraham Lincoln

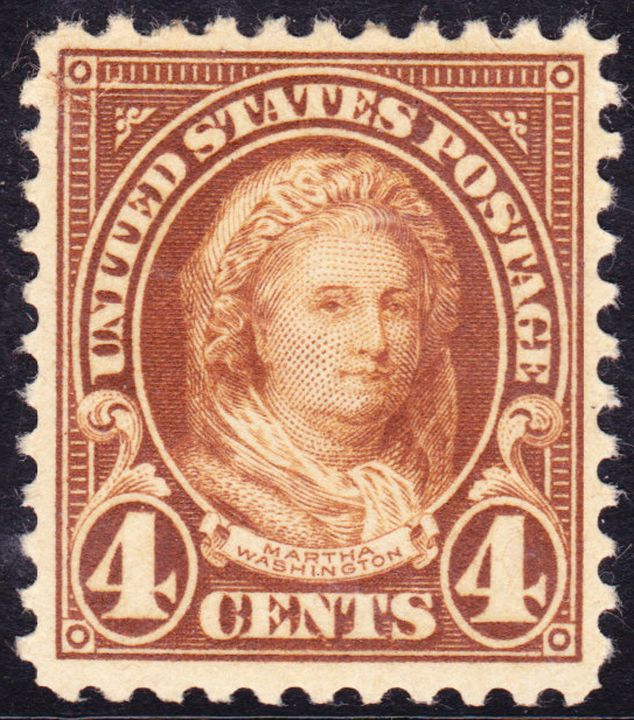
Martha Washington

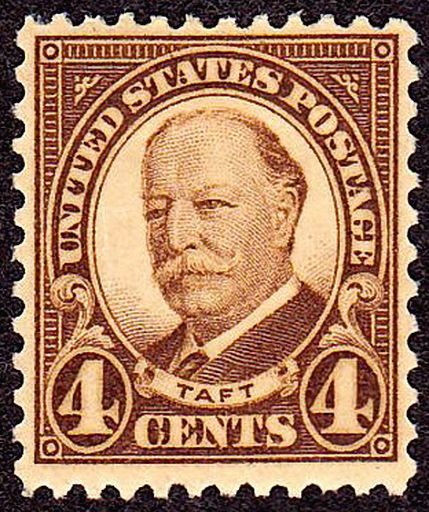
William Howard Taft

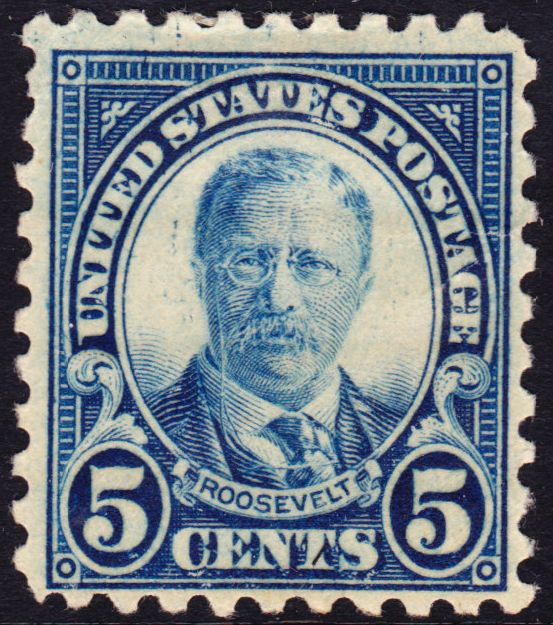
Theodore Roosevelt

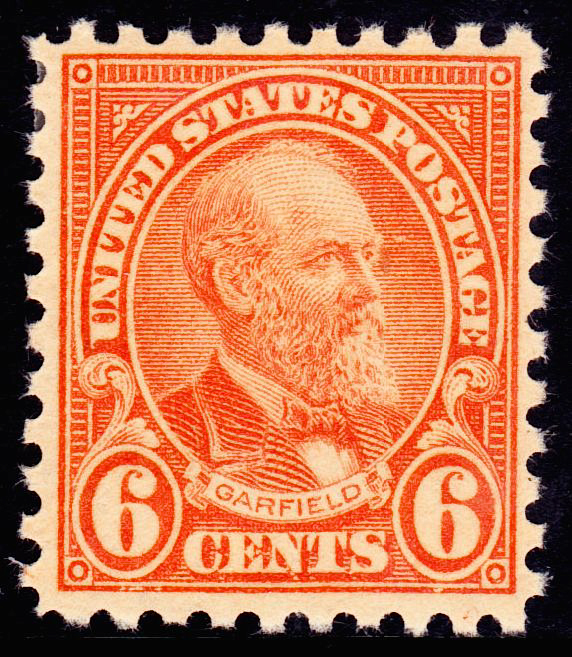
James Garfield

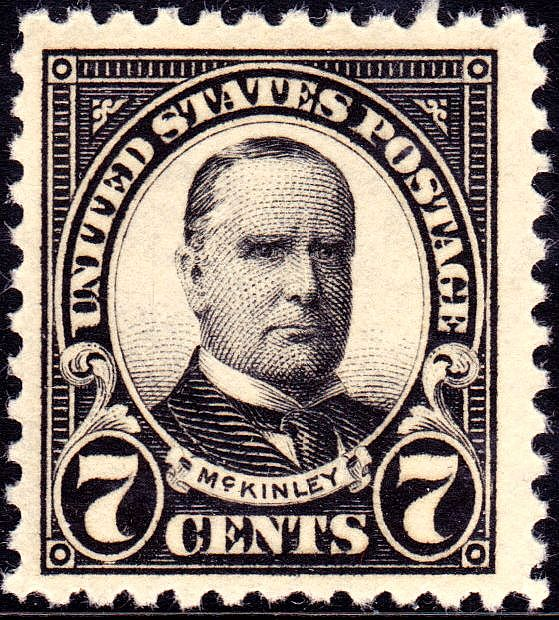
William McKinley

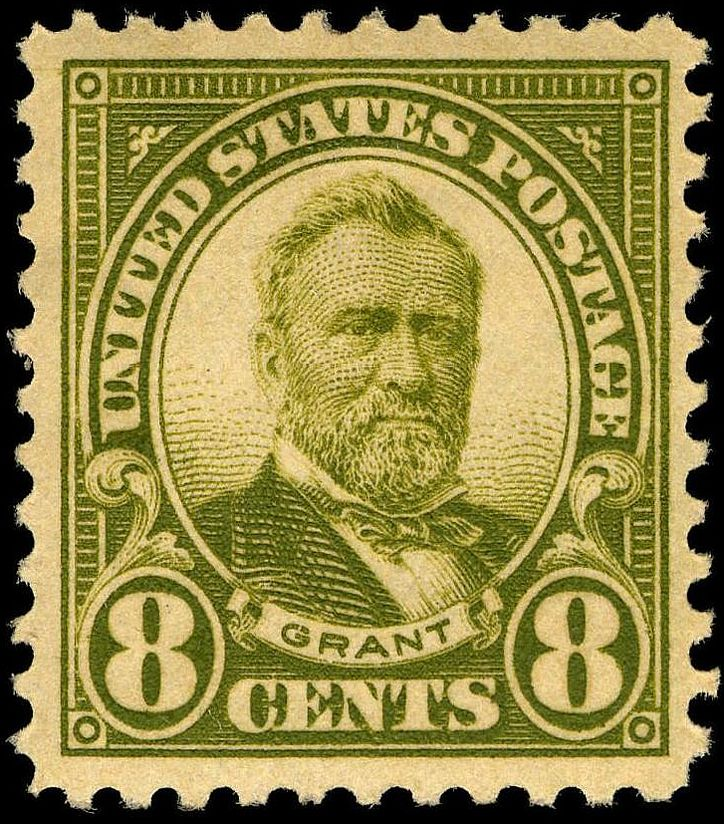
Ulysses S. Grant

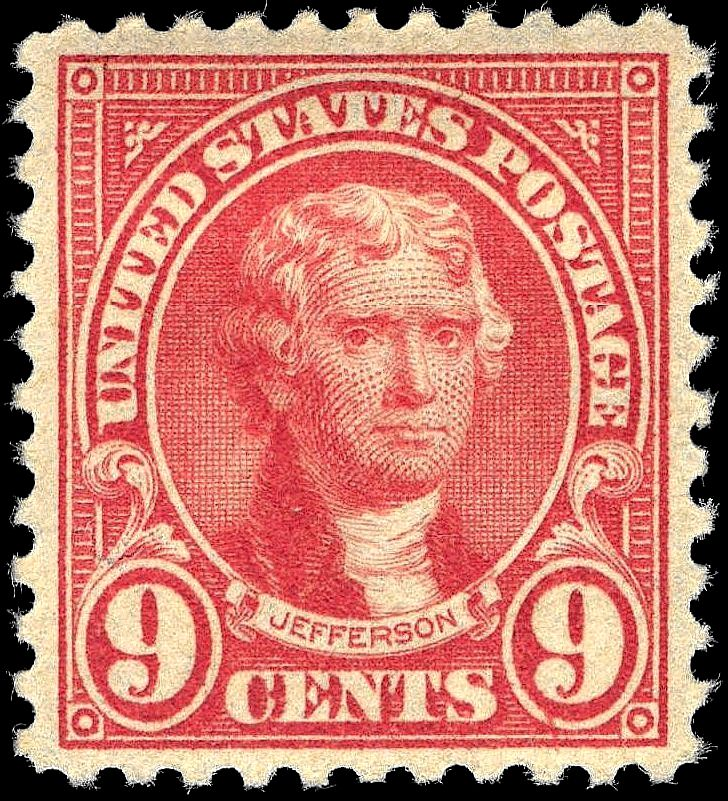
Thomas Jefferson

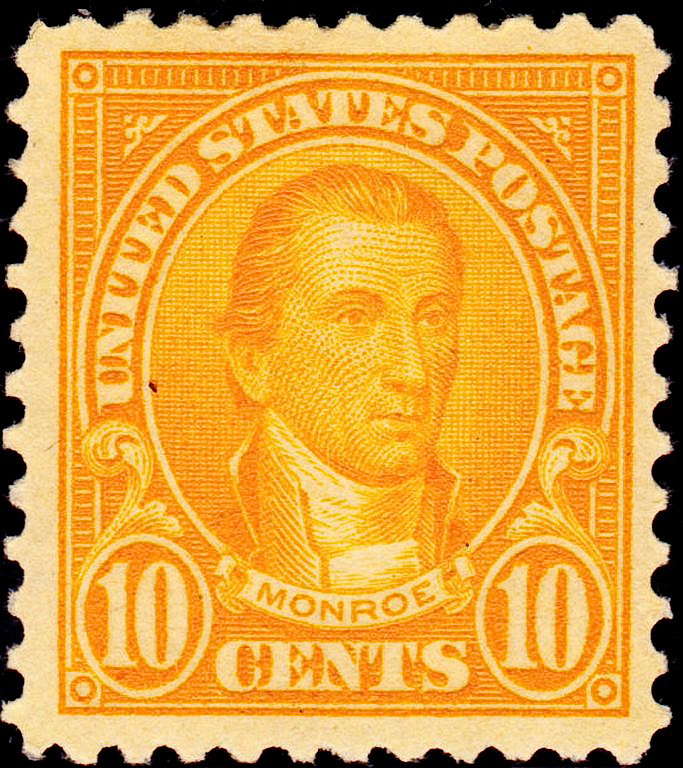
James Monroe

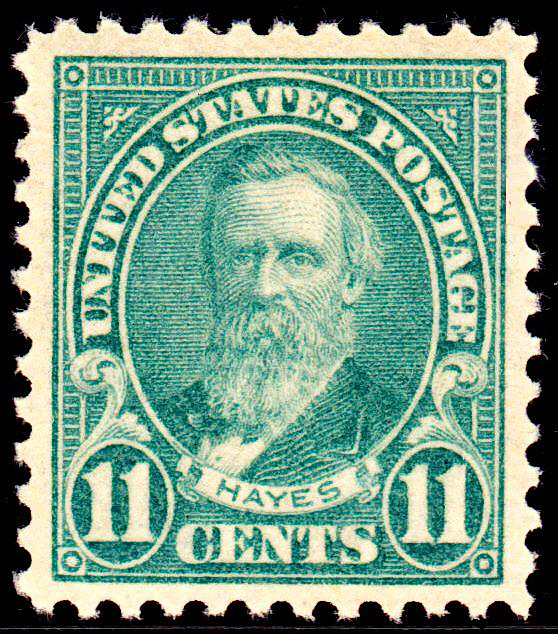
Rutherford B. Hayes

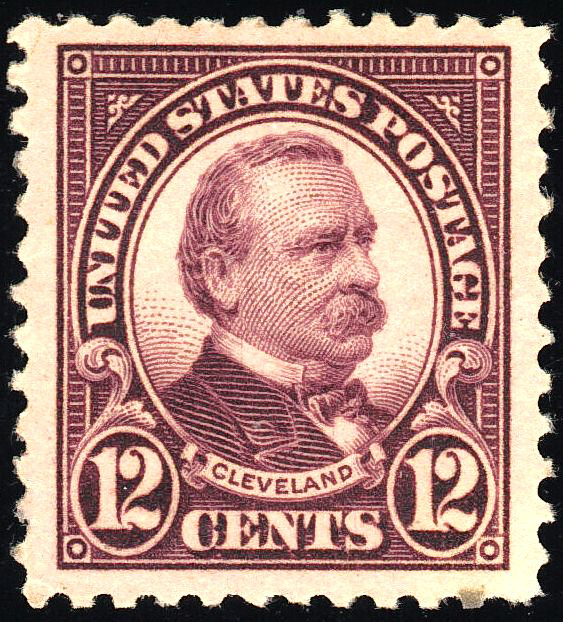
Grover Cleveland

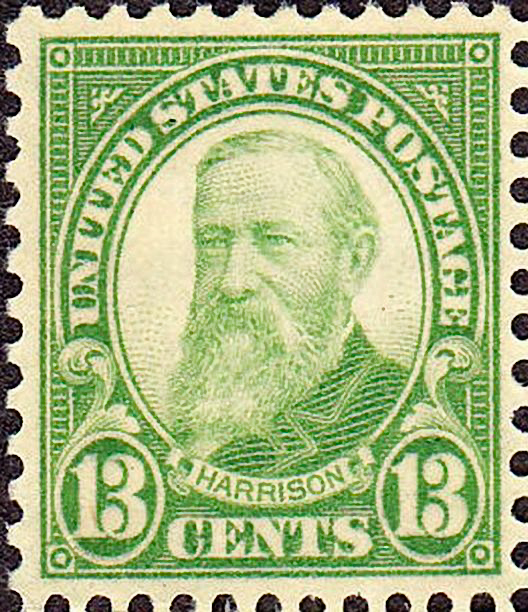
Benjamin Harrison

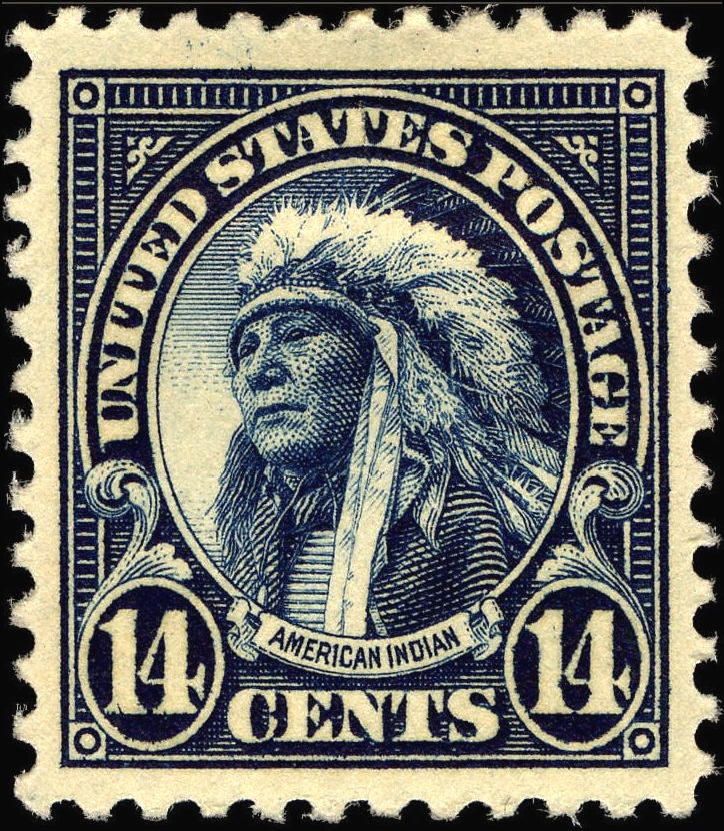
American Indian
Selected Issues

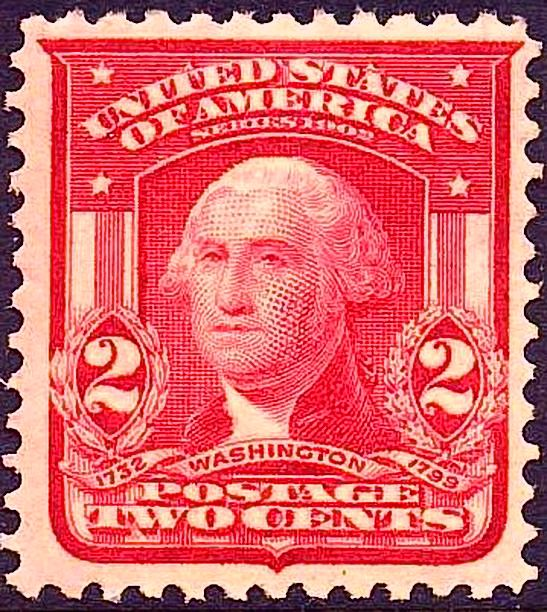
Issue of 1903

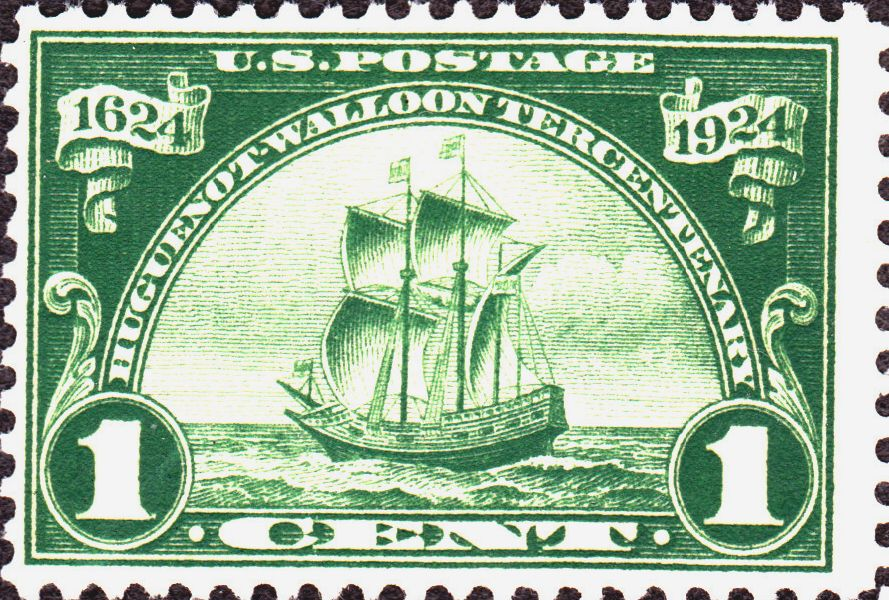
Issue of 1920

== See also ==
- U.S. postage stamp locator
- Postage stamps and postal history of the United States
- Presidents of the United States on U.S. postage stamps
- Washington–Franklin Issues
- US Regular Issues of 1922–1931
- Charles R. Chickering (Artist and U.S. postage stamp designer for Bureau of Engraving and Printing)
- Stamp design
- Commemorative stamp
- Definitive stamp

== Bibliography ==
- "The American Philatelist". The American Philatelist. Vol. IV–VI. Philadelphia: American Philatelic Association. 1889–1892.
- Jones, William A. (2010). Kloetzel, James E. (ed.). Scott Specialized Catalogue of United States Stamps and Covers.
  Scott Publishing Company. ISBN 978-0-89487-446-8.
