= US Regular Issues of 1922–1931 =

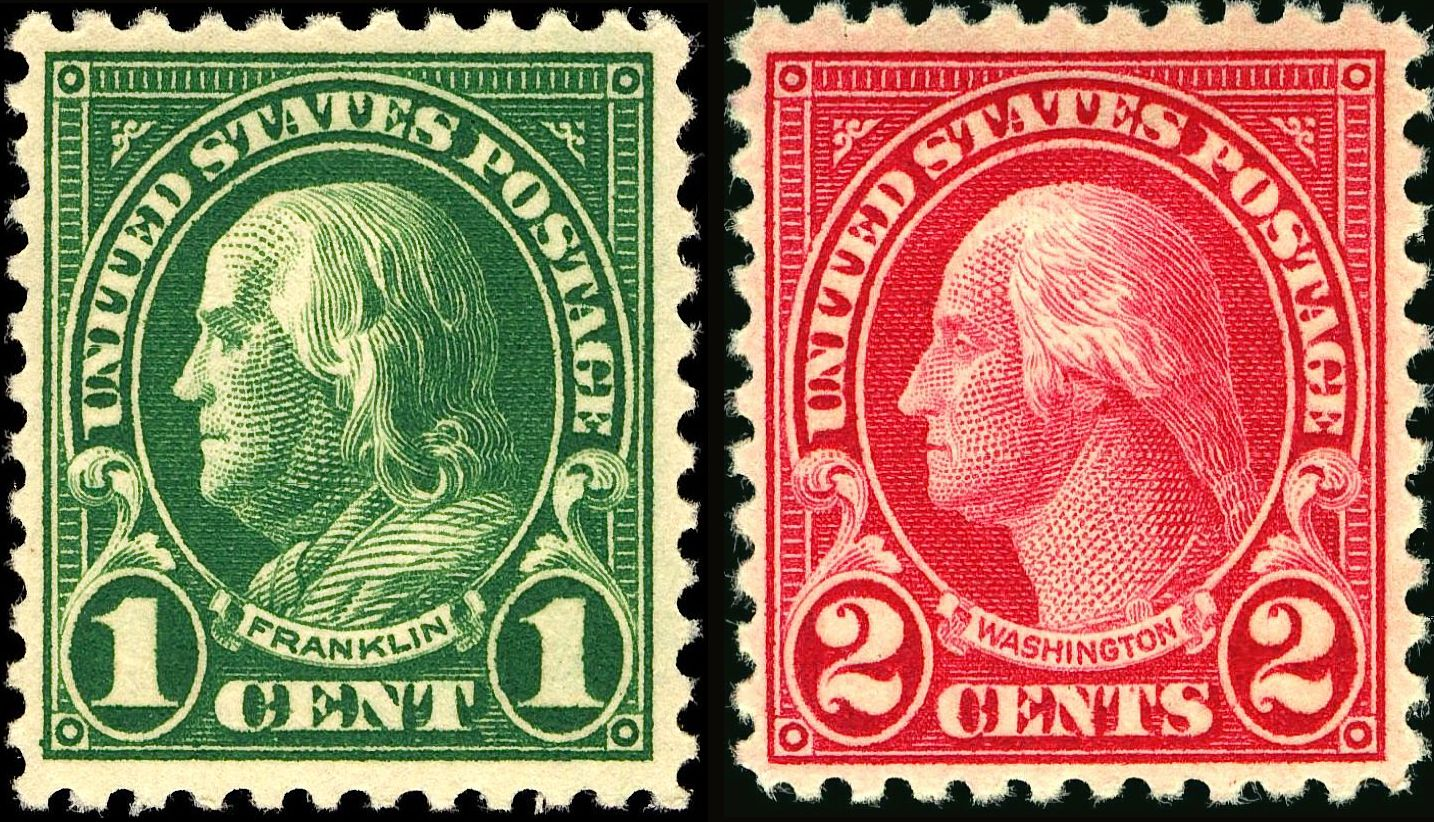
Regular Issues of 1922

The Regular Issues of 1922–1931 were a series of 27 U.S. postage stamps issued for general everyday use by the U.S. Post Office. Unlike the definitives previously in use, which presented only a Washington or Franklin image, each of these definitive stamps depicted a different president or other subject, with Washington and Franklin each confined to a single denomination. The series not only restored the historical tradition of honoring multiple presidents on U.S. Postage but extended it. Offering the customary presidential portraits of the martyred Lincoln and Garfield, the war hero Grant, and the founding fathers Washington and Jefferson, the series also memorialized some of the more recently deceased presidents, beginning with Hayes, McKinley, Cleveland and Roosevelt. Later, the deaths of Harding, Wilson and Taft all prompted additions to the presidential roster of Regular Issue stamps, and Benjamin Harrison's demise (1901) was belatedly deemed recent enough to be acknowledged as well, even though it had already been recognized in the Series of 1902. The Regular Issues also included other notable Americans, such as Martha Washington and Nathan Hale—and, moreover, was the first definitive series since 1869 to offer iconic American pictorial images: these included the Statue of Liberty, the Capitol Building and others. The first time (1869) that images other than portraits of statesmen had been featured on U.S. postage, the general public disapproved, complaining that the scenes were no substitute for images of presidents and Franklin. However, with the release of these 1922 regular issues, the various scenes—which included the Statue of Liberty, the Lincoln Memorial and even an engraving of an American Buffalo—prompted no objections. To be sure, this series (unlike the 1869 issues) presented pictorial images only on the higher-value stamps; the more commonly used denominations, of 12 cents and lower, still offered the traditional portraits.

This series of postage stamps was the fourth to be printed by the Bureau of Engraving and Printing, in Washington D.C.. Postal history "firsts" in these Regular Issues included the first fractional-value postage stamps, the first stamp to pay tribute to the Statue of Liberty and the first postage stamps to honor Warren G. Harding, Rutherford B. Hayes, Grover Cleveland, Theodore Roosevelt, Woodrow Wilson and William Howard Taft.

Upon release these Regular Issues were initially printed on the flat-plate printing press, into which sheets were inserted one at a time, but shortly thereafter they were produced with the Stickney rotary press which printed images with slightly less quality and clarity but which allowed for the dramatic increases in production rates, as printing paper was fed into the press from continuous rolls of paper. The Regular Issues were released over a nine-year period and can be found with three sizes, or gauges, of perforations which are used in the identification of the particular series for which a given stamp belongs.

== Subject and design ==
The definitive postage stamps of 1922, also known by collectors as the Fourth Bureau Issue, were issued in denominations ranging from 1/2-cent to 5-dollars with a corresponding subject and color for each. This would be the second issuance of definitive stamps released by the U.S. Post Office where the name of the subject was spelled out in print, unlike the Washington-Franklins previously issued where the respective subjects were presented in image form only. All the 1922–1931 denominations between 1-cent and 15-cents were printed in colors identical—or nearly identical—to the colors used for their counterparts in the preceding Washington-Franklin series (new colors, of course, had to be chosen for the 1 1/2-cent and 14-cent values, which had not previously been offered). Of the higher-denomination stamps, however, only the 50-cent value retained its Washington-Franklin color (the $2 stamp employed the same blue used for pre-Washington-Franklin $2 designs between 1894 and 1918).

The first stamp of the Regular Issues series was issued on October 4, 1922, the 11-cent Rutherford B. Hayes stamp, which also marked the hundredth anniversary of Hayes's birth. The issue was first released in Hayes' hometown of Fremont, Ohio, and in Washington D.C. Thus began the practice of issuing a new stamp on a specific day and in a particular city. The Hayes stamp is regarded by many collectors as the beginning of modern First Day Cover collecting. Benjamin Franklin and George Washington were traditionally depicted on the most commonly used stamps, the 1- and 2-cent issues, typically used for post cards and 1st class letters. One distinctive design feature of this series is that the stamps valued at 17 cents and higher appear in landscape format, distinguishing them from the less expensive stamps (15 cents and lower), which conform to normal portrait-orientation. Here, the Post Office amplified an idea introduced in the previous Washington-Franklin issues, where landscape format had been used for the $2 and $5 stamps. In the 1922-1931 issues, the corner ornamentation designed for the landscape issues is larger and more elaborate than—yet still aesthetically consonant with—the ornament employed on the lower values.

The Regular Issues were issued in three basic forms, consisting of sheet-stamps, coil-stamps (long strips of single stamps rolled into a 'coil') and booklet stamps (i.e., six stamps to a leaflet). There were three printings, or series, of stamps released on succeeding dates, the average series being released over the course of approximately two years. The 26 different subject themes employed for this issue were used to print more than 75 distinct postage stamp issues in three separate series over a ten-year period.

=== Stamp charts ===
Sheet stamps

US Regular Issues 1922–1931
Description	Flat-Plate printing perf.11 1922–1925 Scott: 551–573	Rotary Press printing perf.10 1923-1926 Scott: 581–591	Rotary Press printing perf.11x10½ 1926–1934 Scott: 622–643 692–701
½-cent, Nathan Hale	Apr. 4, 1925	—	May 25, 1929
1-cent, Benjamin Franklin	Jan. 17, 1923	Oct. 17, 1923	Jun. 10, 1927
1½-cent, Warren G. Harding (i) 1½-cent, Warren G. Harding (ii)	Mar. 19, 1925 —	Mar. 19, 1925 —	May 17, 1927; Dec. 1, 1930
2-cents, George Washington	Jan. 15, 1923	Apr. 14, 1924	Dec. 10, 1926
3-cents, Abraham Lincoln	Oct. 27, 1922	Aug. 1, 1925	Feb. 3, 1927
4-cents, Martha Washington	Jun. 15, 1923	Apr. 4, 1925	May 17, 1927
4-cents, William Howard Taft	—	—	Jun. 4, 1930
5-cents, Theodore Roosevelt	Oct. 27, 1922	Apr. 4, 1925	Mar. 24, 1927
6-cents, James A. Garfield	Nov. 20, 1922	Apr. 4, 1925	Jul. 27, 1927
7-cents, William McKinley	May 1, 1923	May 29, 1926	Mar. 24, 1927
8-cents, Ulysses S. Grant	May 1, 1923	May 29, 1926	Jun. 10, 1927
9-cents, Thomas Jefferson	Jan. 15, 1923	May 29, 1926	May 17, 1927
10-cents, James Monroe	Jan. 15, 1923	Jun. 8, 1925	Feb. 3, 1927
11-cents, Rutherford B. Hayes	Oct. 4, 1922	—	Sep. 4, 1931
12-cents, Grover Cleveland	May 20, 1923	—	Aug. 25, 1931
13-cents, Benjamin Harrison	Jan. 11, 1926	—	Sep. 4, 1931
14-cents, American Indian	May 1, 1923	—	Sep. 8, 1931
15-cents, Statue of Liberty	Nov. 11, 1922	—	Aug. 27, 1931
17-cents, Woodrow Wilson	Dec. 28, 1925	—	Jul. 25, 1931
20-cents, Golden Gate	May 1, 1923	—	Sep. 8, 1931
25-cents, Niagara Falls	Nov. 11, 1922	—	Jul. 25, 1931
30-cents, Buffalo	Mar. 20, 1923	—	Sep. 8, 1931
50-cents, Arlington Amphitheater	Nov. 11, 1922	—	Sep. 4, 1931
1-dollar, Lincoln Memorial	Feb. 12, 1923	—	—
2-dollars, U.S. Capitol	Mar. 30, 1923	—	—
5-dollars, Freedom	Mar. 30, 1923	—	—

Dates are day of first issue.
(i) = Harding in profile, (ii) = Harding 1/4 turn.

See also: Regular Issue Coils of 1923–29

Coil stamps

US Regular Issues, Coil Stamps 1923–1932 Rotary Press Printing
Description	1923–1929 Perf.10 Vrt.	1923–1925 Perf.10 Hz	1932 Perf.10 Vrt.
1-cent – Benjamin Franklin	Jul. 18, 1923	Jul. 19, 1924	—
1½-cent – Warren G. Harding (i) 1½-cent – Warren G. Harding (ii)	Mar. 19, 1925; Dec. 1, 1930	May 9, 1925	—
2-cents – George Washington	Jan. 15, 1923; Mar., 1929	Dec. 21, 1923	—
3-cents – Abraham Lincoln	May 10, 1924	—	—
4-cents – Martha Washington 4-cents – Howard Taft	Aug. 5, 1923; Sep. 18, 1930	—	—
5-cents – Theodore Roosevelt	Mar. 5, 1924	—	—
6-cents – James A. Garfield	—	—	Aug. 18, 1932
10-cents – James Monroe	Jan. 15, 1923	—	—

See also: Regular Issues, sheet stamps

Each of the three previous definitive issues offered by the U.S. Post Office had had at least one printing on watermarked paper. This series would be the first since 1895 issued by the Bureau of Engraving and Printing without watermarks (impressions in the paper). Each of the three different series of the Regular Issues is differently perforated, the first being "perforated 11" on all sides (i. e., eleven holes in a two-centimeter span), the second perforated 10 on all sides and the last perforated 11 horizontally by 10 1/2 vertically. Other distinguishing characteristics involve the actual printings: i.e., the first series was printed on the flat-plate printing press which distinguishes it from the other two series, as these were printed on the rotary press which incorporated two identical printing plates that were bent and affixed around a rotating printing cylinder. The bending of the plate produced a stamp image with slightly longer dimensions than those the flat-plate press produced. The framework designs varied depending on denomination but overall were uniform differing only in color, denomination and ornament type, while the central images depicted a variety of subjects which included presidential figures and other landmark scenes such as those of Niagara Falls, the Statue of Liberty and several other scenes.

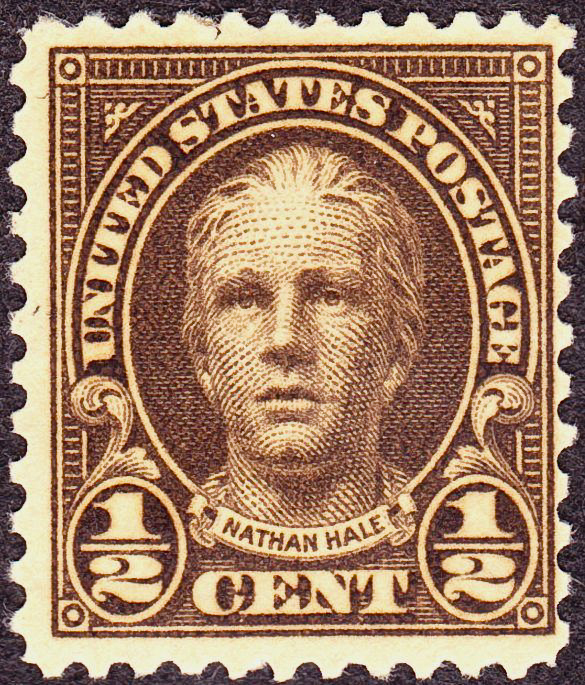
Nathan Hale

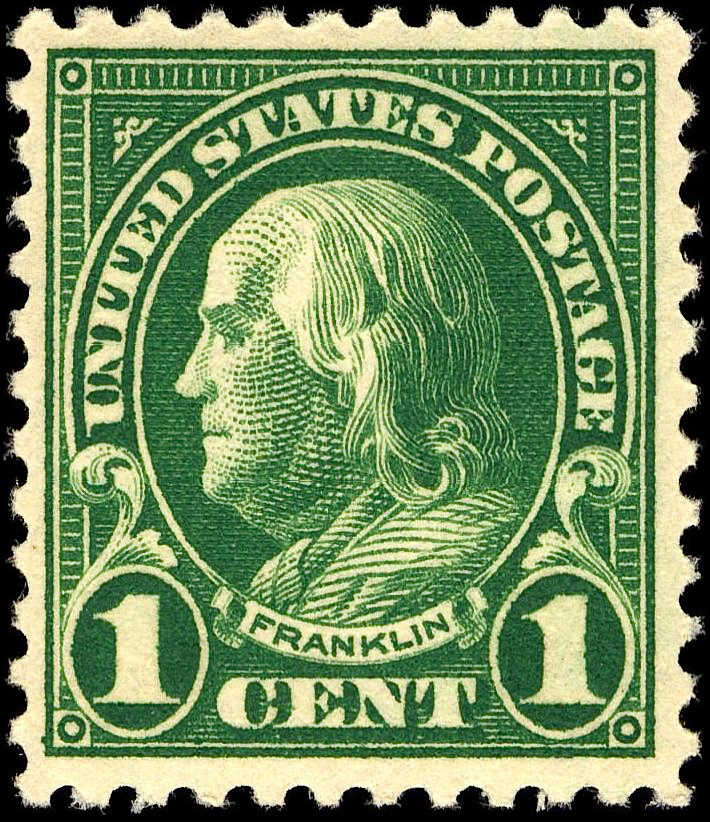
Benjamin Franklin

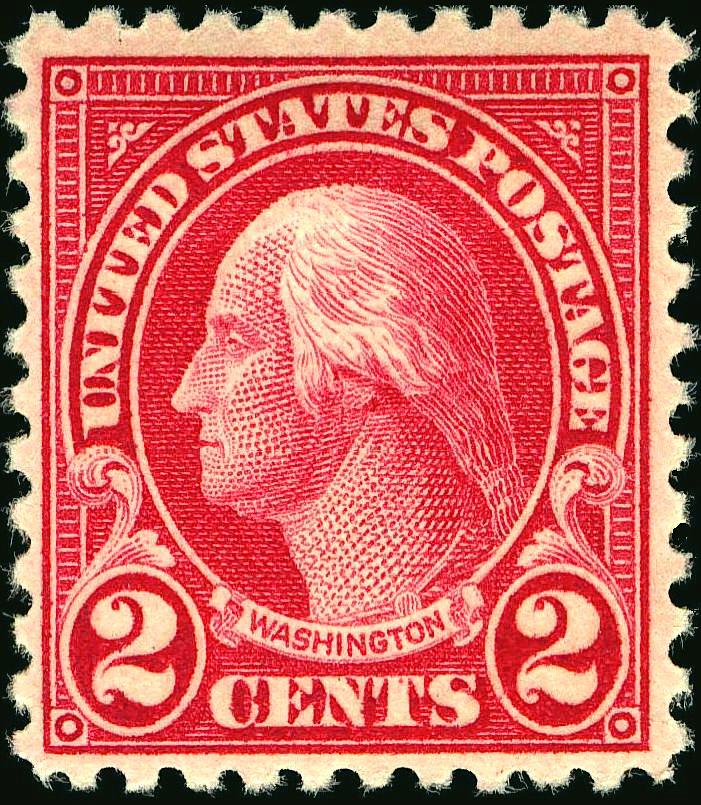
George Washington

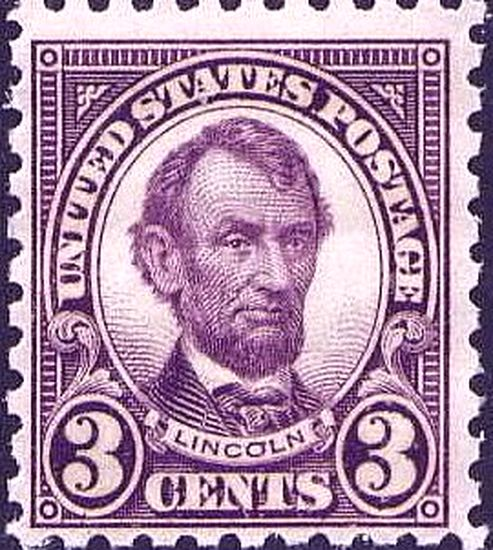
Abraham Lincoln

View Stamp-Charts

- Nathan Hale This was the first half-cent stamp issued by the U.S. Post Office (indeed, the first American postage stamp bearing any fractional denomination) and was issued to accommodate the new postal rates established in 1925. Hale was selected for the subject of this issue by Postmaster General Harry New. The stamp was designed by Clair Aubrey Huston who modeled the image of Hale from a photograph of a clay model of a statue of Hale located at Yale University.
- Benjamin Franklin The engraving of Franklin in this issue was the same one used in the previous Washington-Franklin issue, engraved by Marcus Baldwin of the Bureau in Washington, who modeled his work after a photograph of a plaster bust of Franklin created by Jean Jacques Caffieri in 1777. This issue is one of the few in the series that was issued in sheets, in coils and in booklet form.
- George Washington As the first-class letter rate was 2 cents, this denomination was printed in the billions. This issue continues a tradition, begun in 1847, of portraying Washington on commonly used stamps. Like the engraving of Franklin, also by Marcus Baldwin, the engraving in this design was taken from the same die used on the previous definitive issues, known as the Washington–Franklin Issues.
- Abraham Lincoln This issue was designed by the famous stamp artist Clair Aubrey Huston who employed the engraving of Lincoln by George Smillie that had been used to produce the first 'Bureau Issues' in 1894. Smillie, an engraver at the Bureau of Engraving and Printing, based his work on a photograph of Lincoln taken in 1864 by the famous Civil War photographer Mathew Brady. The issued was first released on Lincoln's birthday, February 12, 1923, in Washington, D.C., and in Hodgenville, Kentucky, located near Lincoln's birthplace.

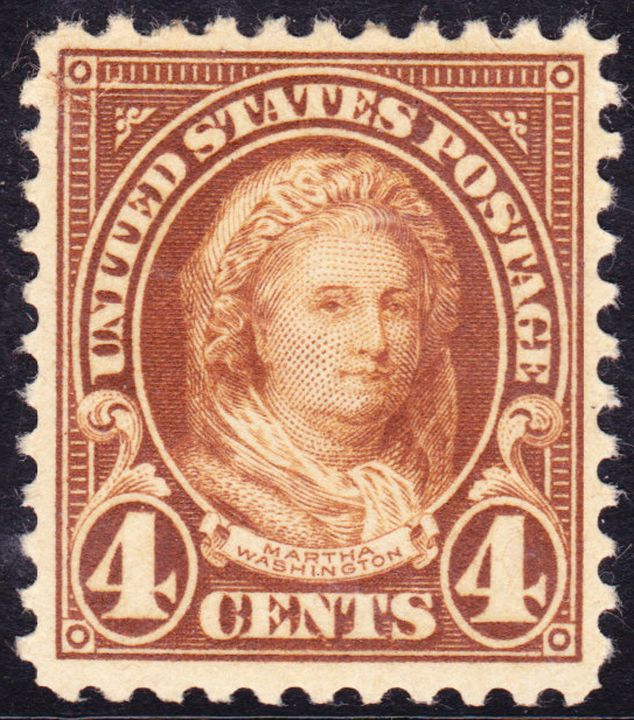
Martha Washington

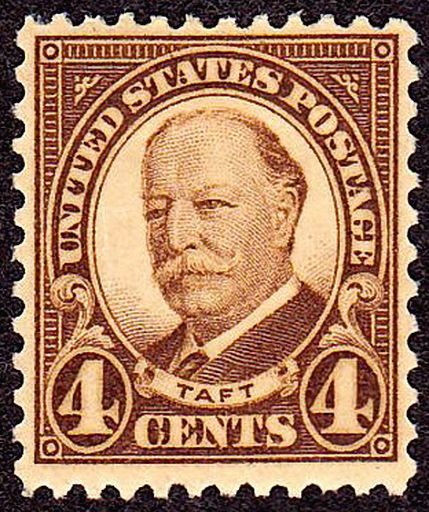
William Howard Taft

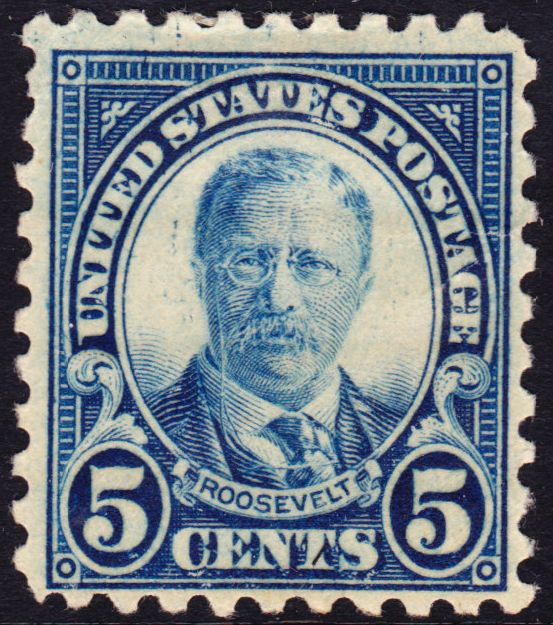
Theodore Roosevelt

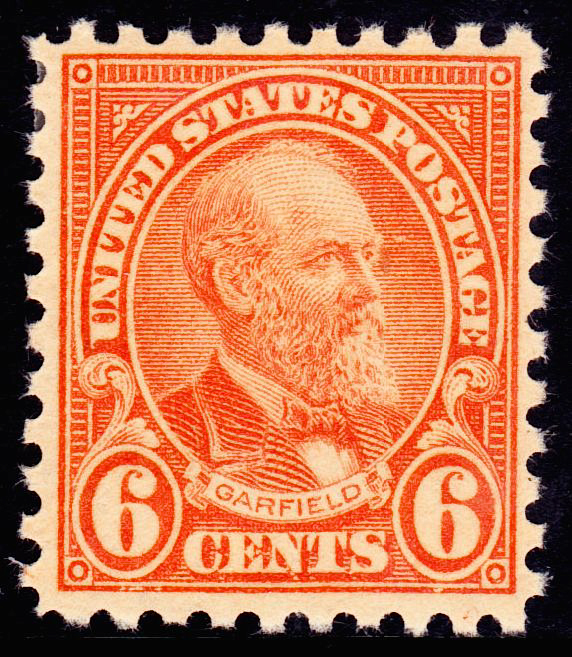
James A. Garfield

View Stamp-Charts

- Martha Washington The 4-cent issue typically paid the postage on a double-weight first class letter. As with many of the other regular issues, Clair Aubrey Huston designed the Martha Washington stamp. The engraving of Martha Washington was performed by Leo C. Kauffmann, who based his work on a drawing by the French artist Charles Francois Jalabert, who in turn based his drawing, in part, on Gilbert Stuart's portrayal of George and Martha Washington. Martha's first appearance on U.S. Postage had occurred in the Regular Issues of 1902-1903.
- William Howard Taft In 1930 two new stamp designs were issued by the U.S. Post Office for two of the existing denominations and were printed with the rotary press. Issued on June 4, the new design replaced the portrait of Martha Washington on the 4-cent issue with that of William Howard Taft who had died in March of that year.
- Theodore Roosevelt This is the first postage stamp to honor Roosevelt. It was issued on his birthday, October 27, 1922, in Washington D.C. and in his home town of Oyster Bay, New York. The stamp was commonly used on letters to foreign destinations with its blue color conforming to Universal Postal Union regulations for stamps used on foreign mail. Clair Aubrey Huston designed the stamp. The image of Roosevelt was engraved by John Eissler who modeled his engraving after a photograph taken of Roosevelt in 1907 by the Harris & Ewing firm in Washington, D.C.
- James A. Garfield The release of the 6-cent Garfield stamp marked the sixth time Garfield would appear on U.S. Postage. Slated for release on Garfield's birthday on November 19, a Sunday, when post offices were closed, the Garfield issue was instead released on the 20th in Washington, D.C. only, as there was no post office in Garfield's hometown of Orange, Ohio, at the time of its issue. Like all of the Garfield stamps issued previously the Regular Issue Garfield stamp was based on a photograph of Garfield taken by New York photographer Edward Bierstadt. The image of Garfield was engraved by John Eissler.

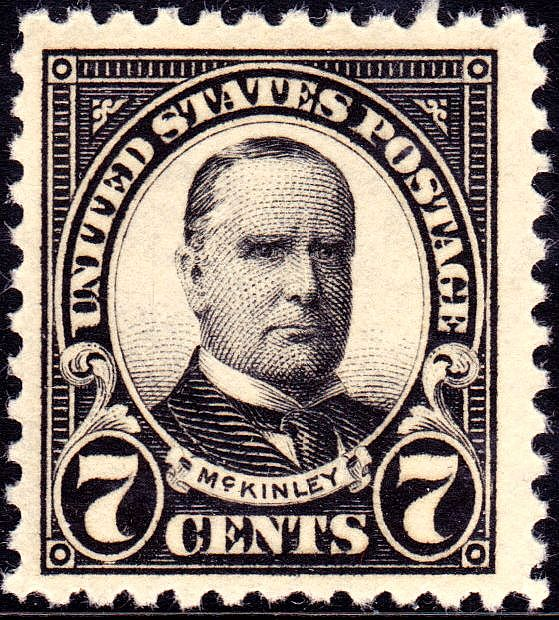
William McKinley

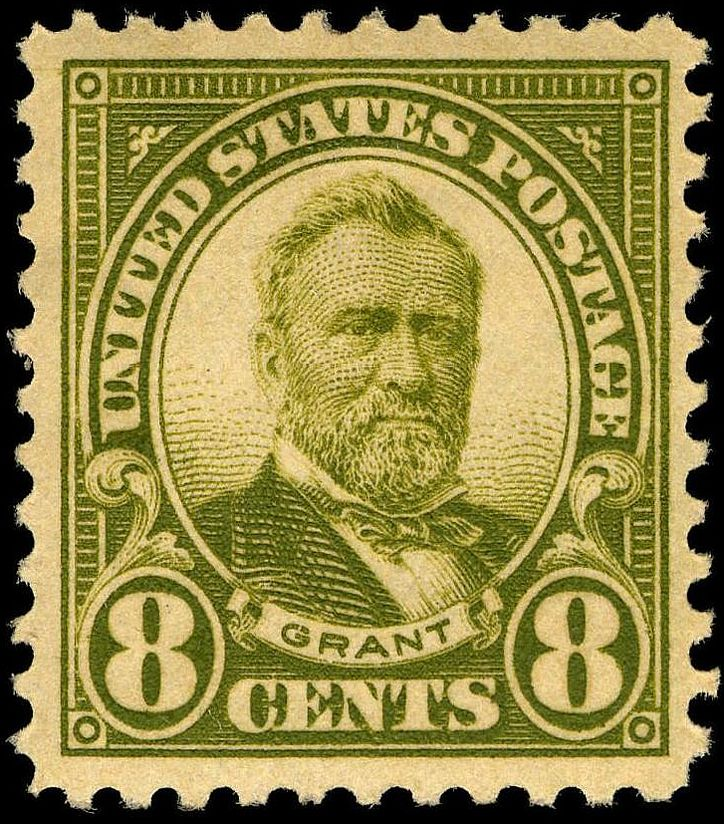
Ulysses S Grant

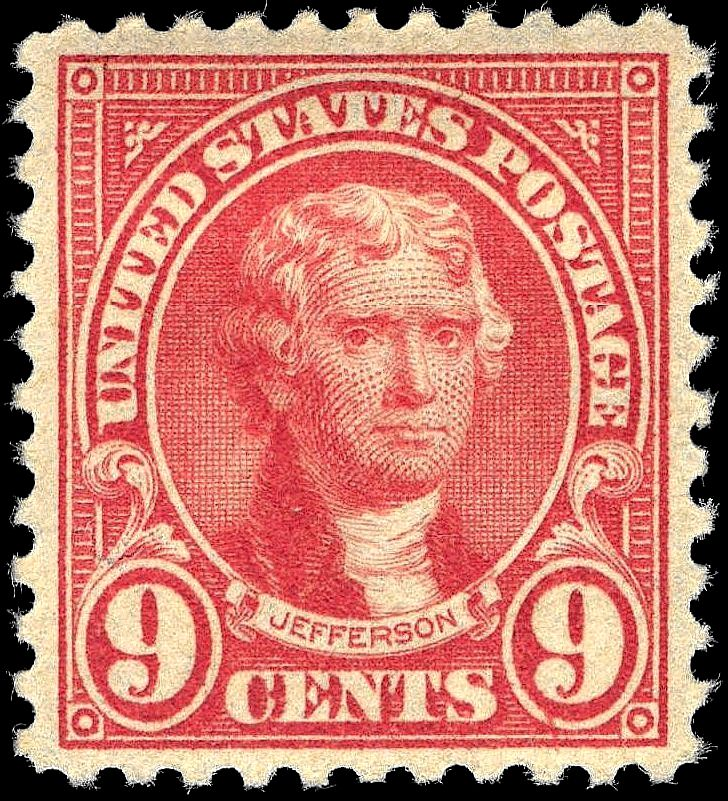
Thomas Jefferson

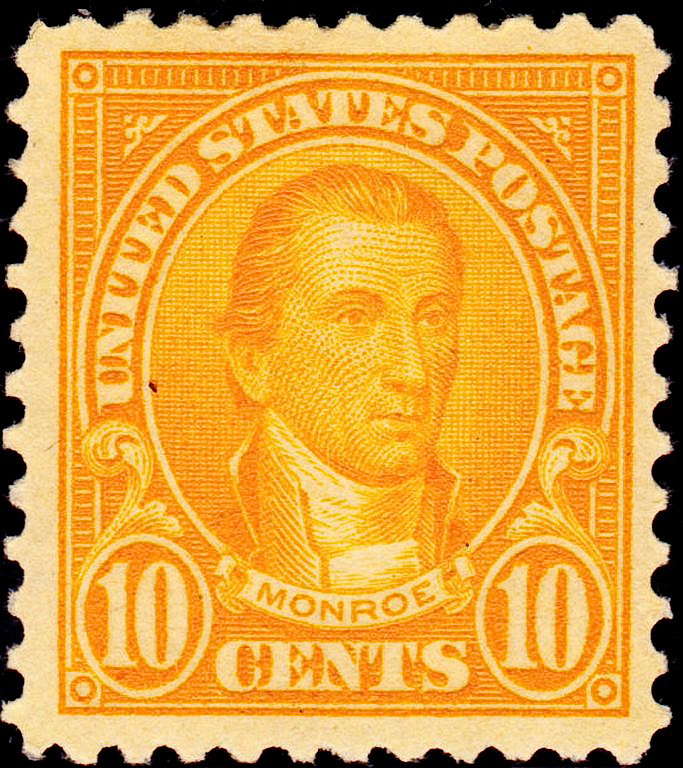
James Monroe

View Stamp-Charts

- William McKinley This issue marks McKinley's second appearance on U.S. Postage; he had first appeared on the 5-cent issue of the Louisiana Purchase Exposition Issue. Clair Aubrey Huston designed the 7-cent McKinley stamp. The engraving of McKinley's image was performed by Louis Schofield of the Bureau of Engraving and Printing, who modeled his image after a photograph of the president by George Rockwood taken in 1898. The stamp was first issued on May 1, 1923, in Niles, Ohio, McKinley's birthplace and in Washington, D.C.
- Ulysses S. Grant On May 1, 1923, the U.S. Post Office issued an 8-cent definitive issue honoring Ulysses S. Grant. Clair Aubrey Huston designed the stamp image. A photograph of Grant taken by renowned Civil War photographer Mathew Brady served as the model for Huston's vignette. The die for the vignette was engraved by Louis Schofield. Grant had appeared in five previous definitive series.
- Thomas Jefferson Jefferson's image is not new to U.S. Postage; he had appeared for the first time in 1856. The engraving of Jefferson's image in this issue was performed by George F.C. Simille, whose image of Jefferson first appeared on the 2-cent value of the 1904 Louisiana Purchase Exposition Series. The engraving was modeled after a portrait of Jefferson painted by Gilbert Stuart in 1805. Simille's engraving of Jefferson was transferred to a new die and restored by John Eissler and Leo Kauffmann for use in the printing of this stamp issue.
- James Monroe Clair Aubrey Huston designed the Monroe stamp. For Monroe's image he used an engraving done by George F.C. Simille previously used to produce the 3-cent issue of the 1904 Louisiana Purchase Exposition Series. Edward J. Hein transferred Simille's engraving to a new die and restored it for the new stamp. Simille's engraving was probably based on an engraving by Asher Durand, which itself seems to have been based on a painting by John Vanderlyn which now hangs in City Hall, New York City.

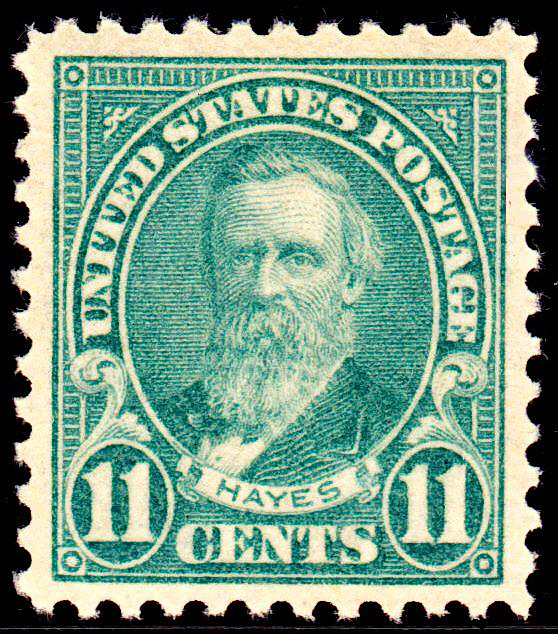
Rutherford B.Hayes

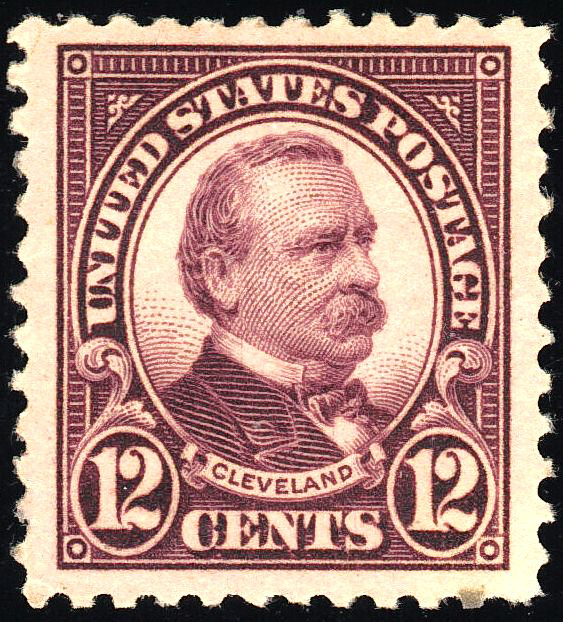
Grover Cleveland

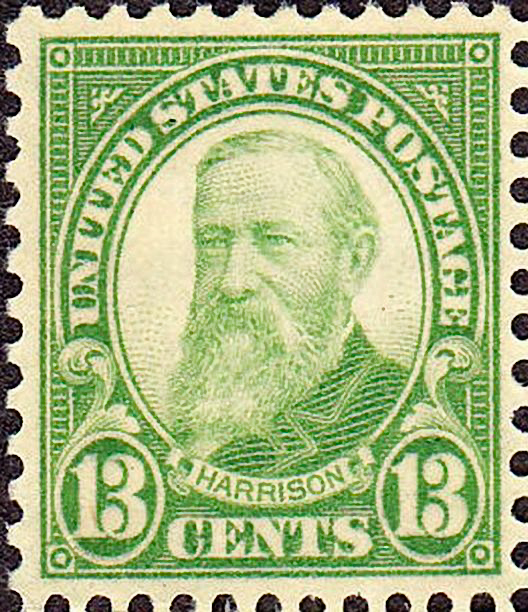
Benjamin Harrison

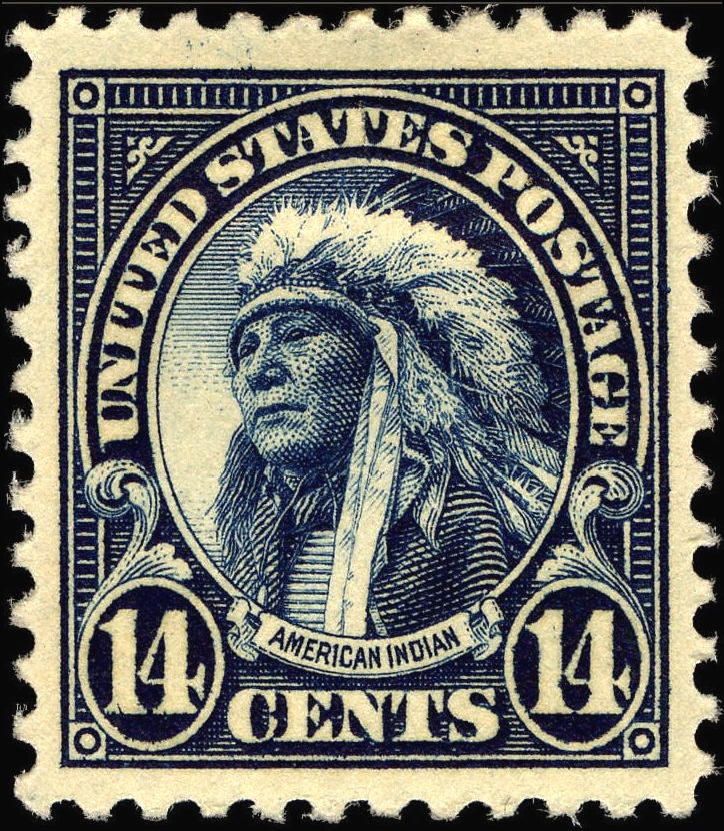
American Indian

View Stamp-Charts

- Rutherford B. Hayes An 11-cent postage stamp was issued on the 100th anniversary of Hayes' birth, October 4, 1922, in Washington, D.C., and in Hayes' hometown, Fremont, Ohio, and marked the beginning of the regular issues in 1922. This is the first U.S. postage stamp to honor Hayes. The issue was designed by Clair Aubrey Huston. The engraving of Hayes is modeled after a photograph taken by prominent Civil War photographer Mathew Brady. John Eissler engraved Rutherford's image on the die for the vignette.
- Grover Cleveland This was the first postage stamp to honor Cleveland. Clair Aubrey Huston designed the stamp and John Eissler engraved the image of Cleveland using a photo that is listed by the Bureau of Engraving and Printing as "unknown." This issue was released on March 20, 1923, two days after Cleveland's birthday, the 18th, which fell on a Sunday that year. As post offices were closed on Sunday the stamp was released the following Tuesday, in Cleveland's hometown of Caldwell, New Jersey, and in Washington, D.C.
- Benjamin HarrisonThe 13-cent Harrison stamp was designed by Clair Aubrey Huston. John Eissler engraved the vignette image of Harrison, basing it on the same photograph of Harrison (one provided by Harrison's widow) that had been the source of the 1902 stamp. A late addition to the series, it was issued January 11, 1926, both in Indianapolis, Indiana, where Harrison had long resided, and Washington, D.C. This would be Harrison's second appearance on U.S. Postage.
- American Indian This was the first 14-cent stamp issued by the U.S. Post Office. Clair Aubrey Huston designed the stamp, drawing his inspiration from De Lancey Gill's photograph of Hollow Horn Bear (1850–1913), a Brule Sioux. The photograph was taken in March 1905 when Hollow Horn Bear was in Washington, D.C., for the inauguration of Theodore Roosevelt. The Smithsonian Institution is now the owner of the photo. The die which produced the image of Hollow Horn Bear was engraved by Louis Schofield.

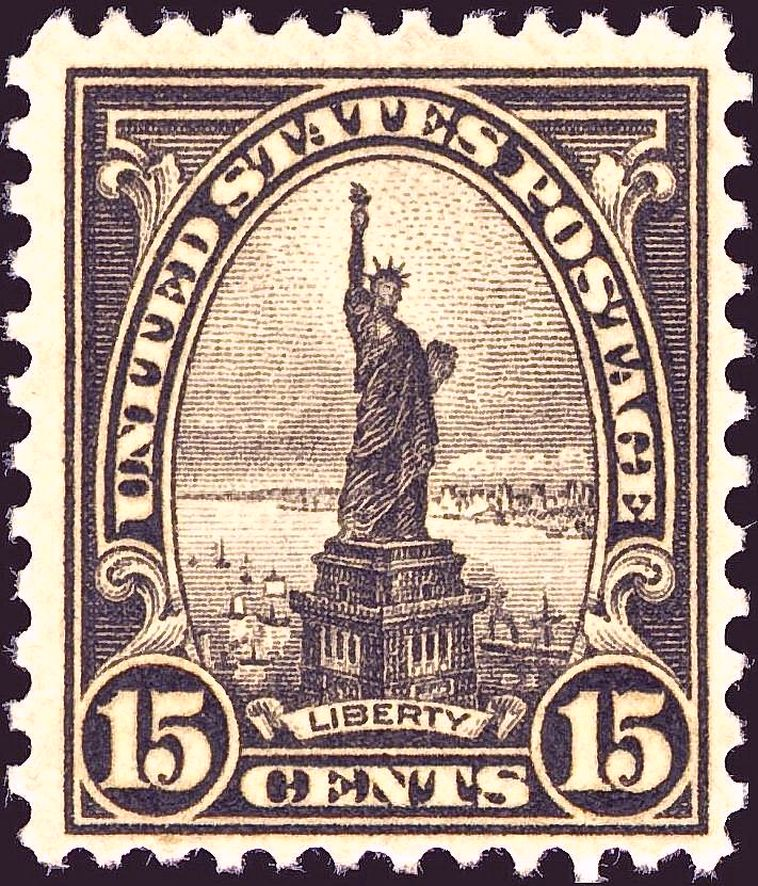
Statue of Liberty

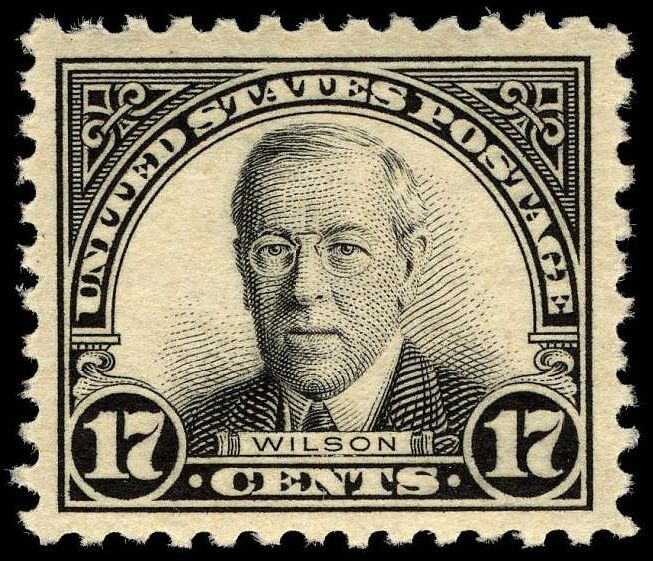
Woodrow Wilson

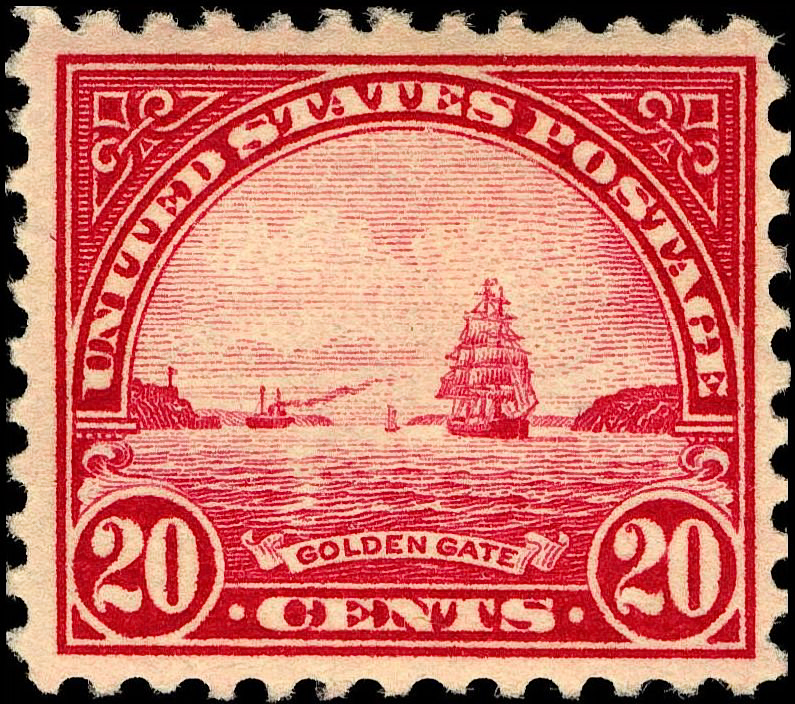
Golden Gate

View Stamp-Charts

- Statue of Liberty Issued on November 11, 1922, this is the first U.S. Postage stamp to feature the Statue of Liberty. The design for this issue is unlike any other in the series with its arrangement of lettering and ornaments. Clair Aubrey Huston designed the stamp taking his inspiration from an 1888 engraving by Charles Skinner, formally of the American Bank Note Company. Louis S. Schofield engraved the die for the image of Liberty. Edward Hall and Joachim Benzing engraved the frame, which is unique in the series.
- Woodrow Wilson This issue was the first 17-cent stamp to be issued by the U.S. Post Office. It was also the first issue to honor Woodrow Wilson who had died less than a year from the day this stamp was released on December 28, 1925. When a postage stamp is issued shortly after the passing of a President it is generally considered a memorial to that President. Clair Aubrey Huston designed the stamp image basing it on a photograph provided by the President's widow, while John Eissler of the Bureau of Engraving and Printing engraved Wilson's image on the steel die using the same photo as a model.
- Golden Gate The stamp was issued at both Washington, D.C., and San Francisco on May 14, 1923. The engraving was performed by Louis S. Schofield who modeled it after a painting by W.A. Coulter. The sailing ship in the painting and on the stamp is the W.F. Babcock. This was the last U.S. postage stamp to be approved by President Harding's outgoing postmaster general, Hubert Work.

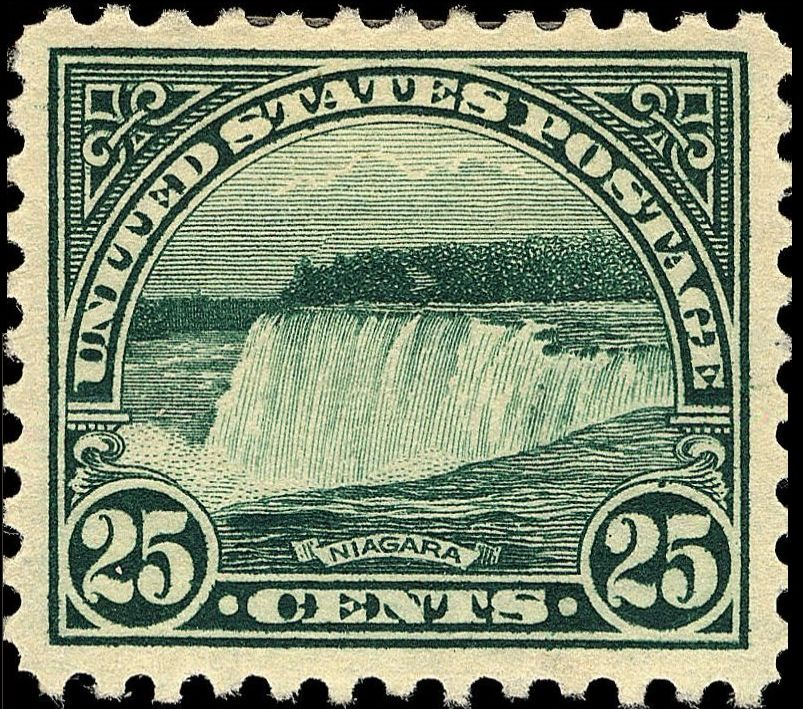
Niagara Falls

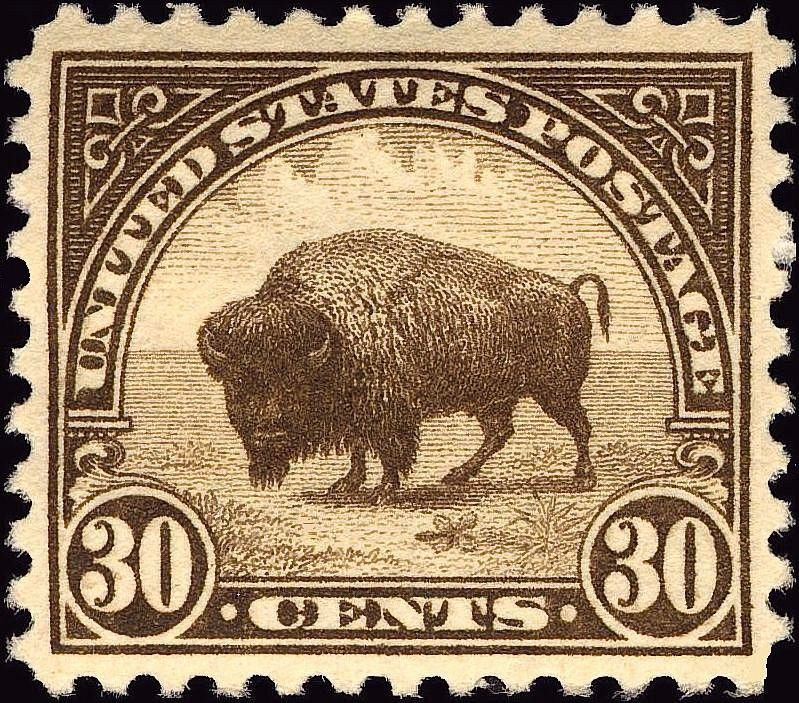
American Buffalo

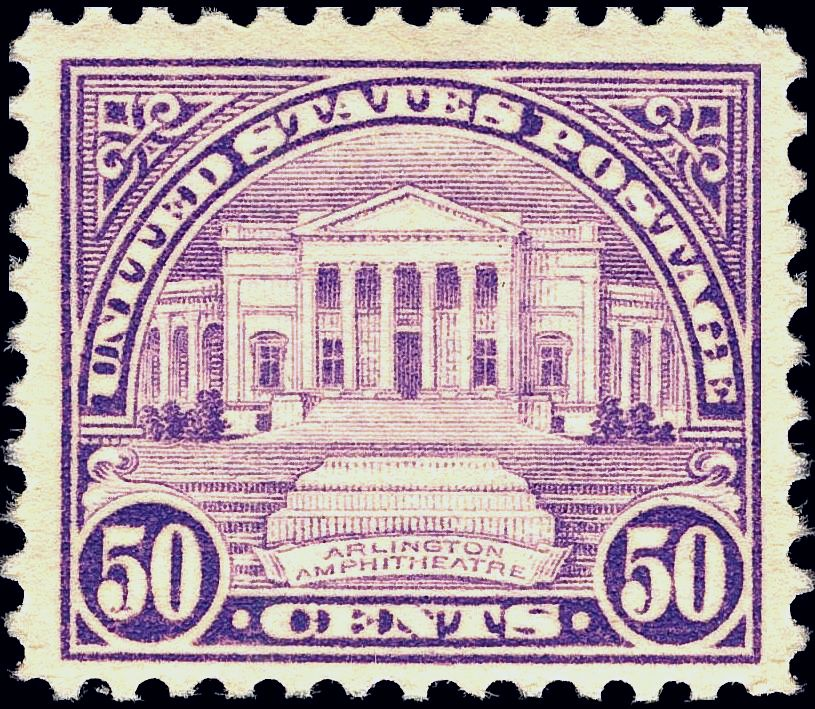
Arlington Amphitheater

View Stamp-Charts

- Niagara Falls Clair Aubrey Huston designed the 25-cent issue, Charles Chalmers engraved the image of the Falls.
- American Buffalo The 30-cent buffalo issue is the only stamp of the series that does not have a ribbon-banner and title directly below the central image (vignette) of the stamp. This issue was also designed by Clair Aubrey Huston who chose a drawing of a bison by artist Charles R. Knight in 1901, famous for his paintings of dinosaurs, while the actual engraving of the buffalo was done by Louis Schofield of the Bureau of Engraving and Printing.
- Arlington Amphitheater The 50-cent stamp depicts the Arlington Amphitheater, which had recently had the Tomb of the Unknown Soldier installed in its plaza. Clair Aubrey Huston designed the stamp after a photograph of the Amphitheater. The engraving of the Amphitheater was performed by Louis Schofield.

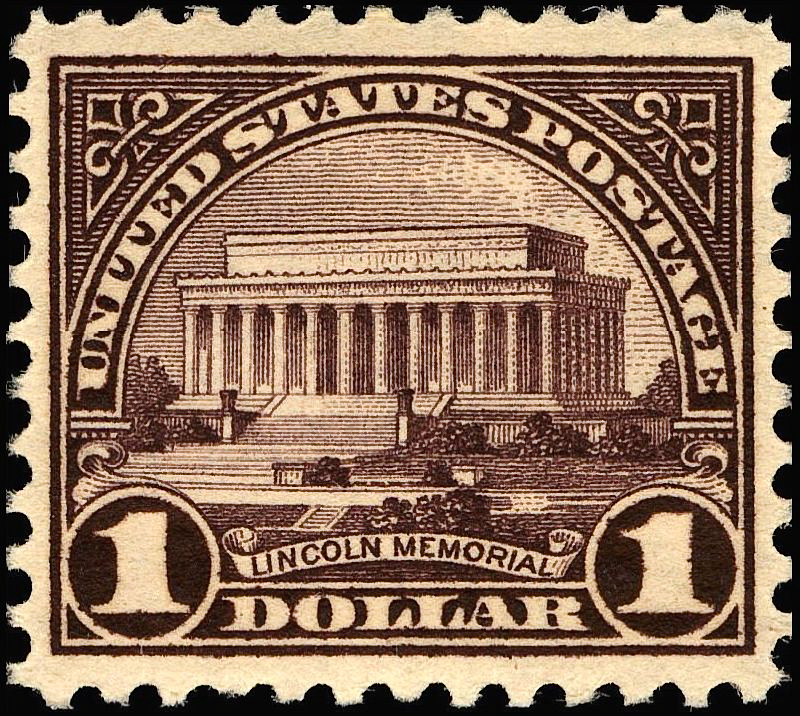
Lincoln Memorial

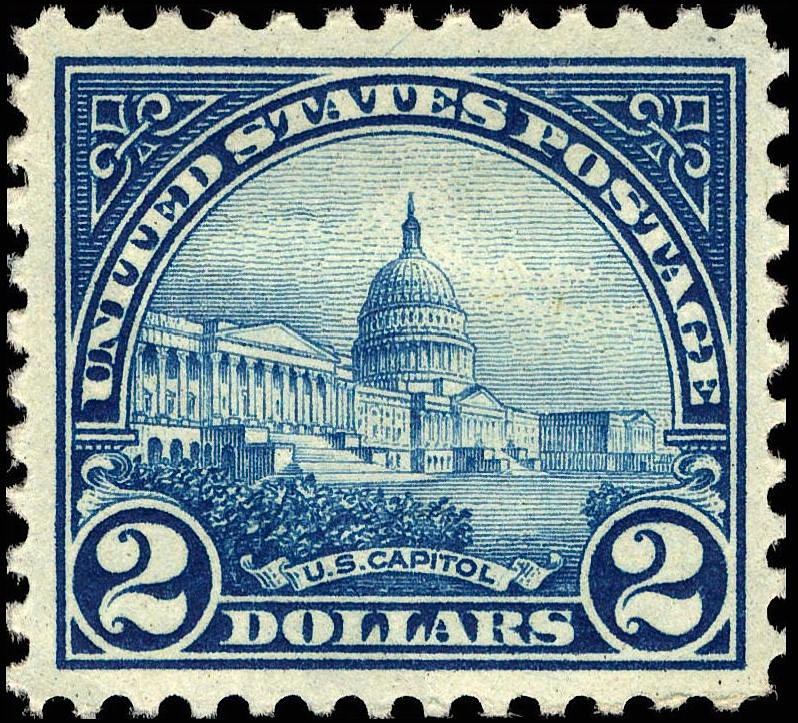
US Capitol

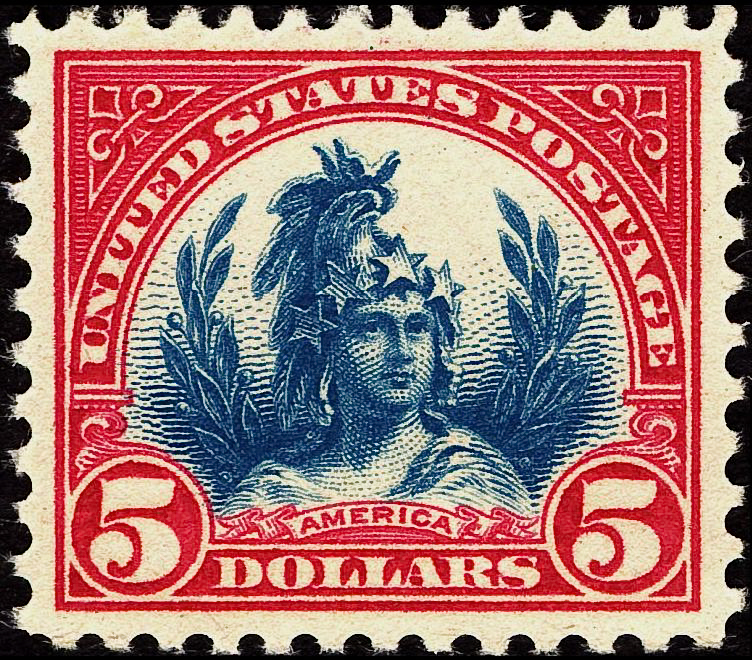
Allegory of Freedom

View Stamp-Charts

The 1-, 2- and 5-dollar denominations were printed only once, early in 1923, with the flat-plate printing press, unlike most of the others which were later reprinted with the Rotary Press also.

- Lincoln Memorial This first stamp to feature the Lincoln Memorial was issued in Springfield, Illinois, and in Washington D.C, on Lincoln's birthday, February 12, 1923. This 1-dollar issue was released only a few months after the completion and dedication of the Memorial. Clair Aubrey Huston designed the image using a U.S. Army photograph taken of the Memorial upon its completion. The engraving of the building was performed by Louis S. Schofield.
- US Capitol The stamp was designed by Clair Aubrey Huston and released in Washington, D.C., on March 20, 1923. The image of the U.S. capitol was engraved by Louis A. Schofield. U.S. Post Office. The issue was printed with the flat-plate printing press only.
- Allegory of Freedom The 5-dollar and highest denomination of the series features the Head of Freedom Statue which stands atop of the U.S. Capitol dome in Washington, D.C. The bi-colored stamp, with its blue colored vignette and red frame, required the manufacture of two plates, one for the vignette and one for the frame and required two separate passes through the printing press. The image of America was engraved by John Eissle and was modeled after the statue Freedom Triumphant in War and Peace by Thomas Crawford, which was erected on December 2, 1863, atop the Capitol building in Washington D.C.

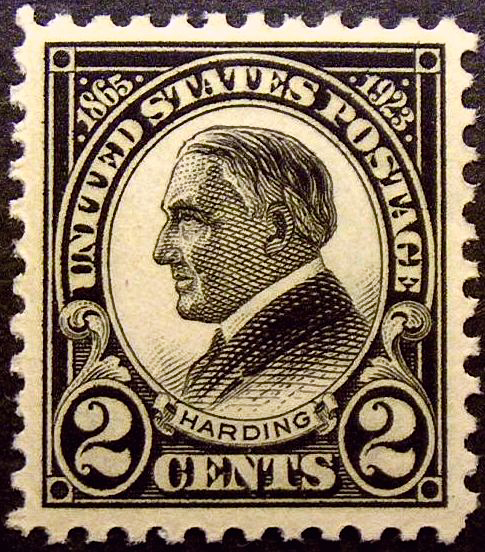
Warren G. Harding Memorial Issue of 1923

== Untimely appearance of Harding ==
With the sudden death of Warren G. Harding on August 2, 1923, the U.S. Post Office was quick to release a memorial stamp in his honor only one month later, a record. By and large, it incorporated the same design as the Regular Issues of this time, the only differences being 1) that the dates of Harding's birth and death were inscribed in the upper two corners of the stamp, 2) that no hatch-lines appear in the rectangular frame and 3) that the corner circles are a solid color. Clair Aubrey Huston designed this issue in one day using a modified version of the existing frame to surround an image taken from a copperplate etching of Harding. The issue was first released on September 1, in Harding's hometown of Marion, Ohio, and in the District of Columbia. Four varieties were ultimately issued: a flat-plate-printed perforated 11 and a rotary plate perforated 10, an error imperforate that was then officially reproduced, and a very rare version, the rotary perforated 11 (discussed below in "Oddities of the issue"). The black-colored memorial stamp itself is not considered a Regular Issue by collectors, however its basic design and theme was used in the three separate printings of the 1½-cent stamp that was added to the regular Issue a year and a half after the memorial issue.

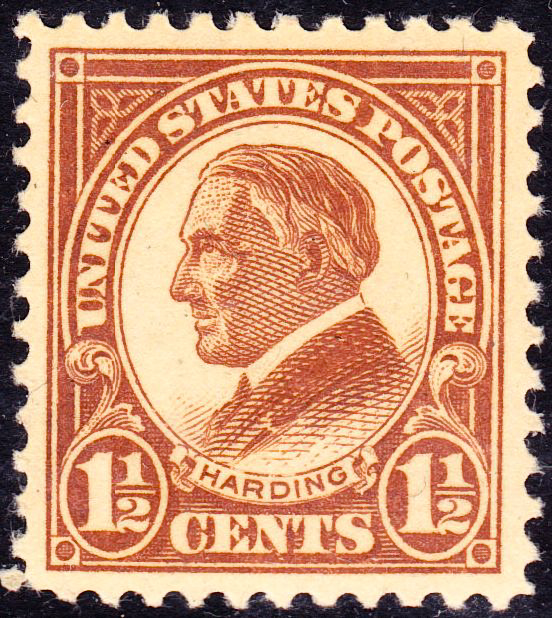
Issue of 1925

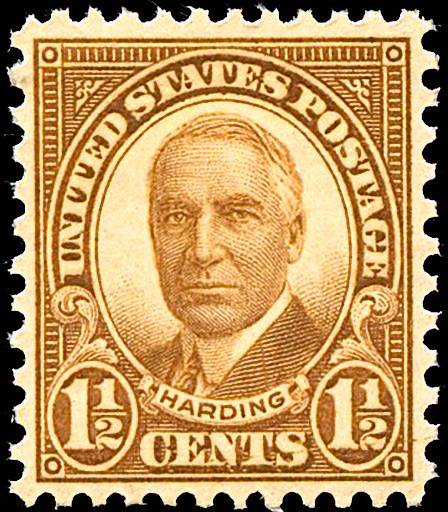
Issue of 1930

It was in March 1925 that the Post Office added the 1 1/2-cent Harding stamp to the current Regular Issues. Printed in brown, it uses the same profile that had appeared in the memorial stamp. The ornaments in the upper two corners of the design are found on no other stamp of the 1922-25 Issues, and the rectangular frame and corner circles remain unfilled.

In 1930 another regular issue was slated to honor Harding, but at the request of Harding's widow, Florence, a full-faced image of Harding was engraved after a photo provided by the former First Lady. The corner ornaments, frame-hatching and corner circles are now identical to those on all other stamps in the series between 1/2-cent and 14-cents.

== Coil stamps ==
The coil stamps of the Regular Issues have for themselves one distinguishing feature and were all issued with gauge 10 perforations, both in vertical and horizontal formats. These coil stamps were printed by the rotary press from continuous rolls of paper, hence the printed image is slightly longer in one direction than their flat-plate counterparts. Coil stamps were issued in a limited range of denominations which include 1, 1½, 2, 3, 4, 5, 6 and 10 cents only, denominations of 11 cents and greater not existing in coil form. The 6-cent Garfield coil was the last stamp issued in this definitive series, produced in 1932 for use on double-weight letters after the first-class letter rate had been raised to 3 cents.

Selected issues:

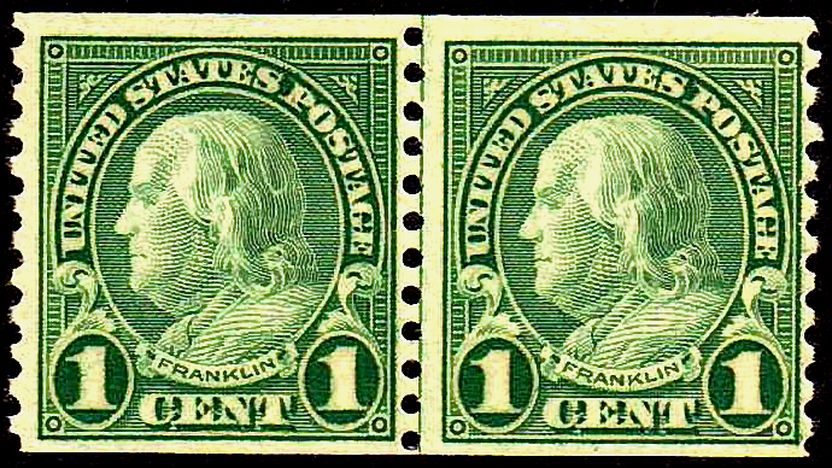
Jul.18, 1923

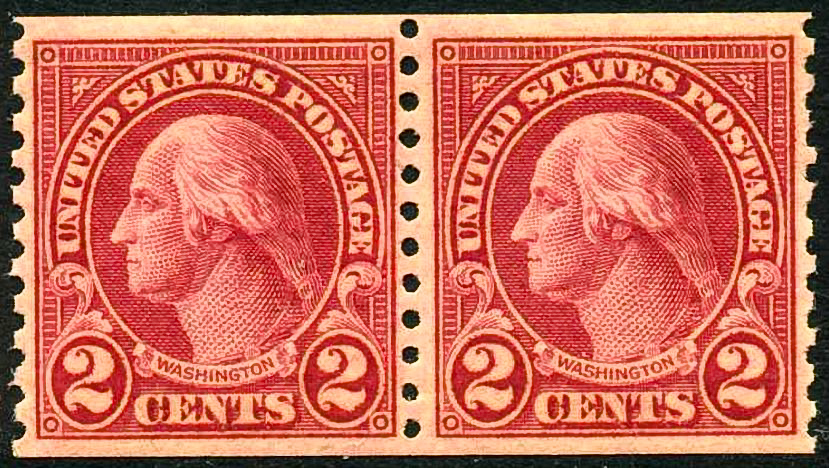
Jan.15, 1923

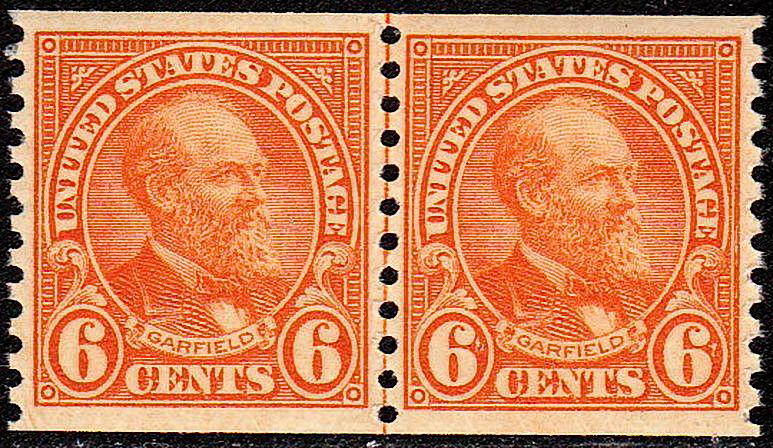
Aug.18, 1932

View Stamp-Charts

== Kansas-Nebraska Overprints ==
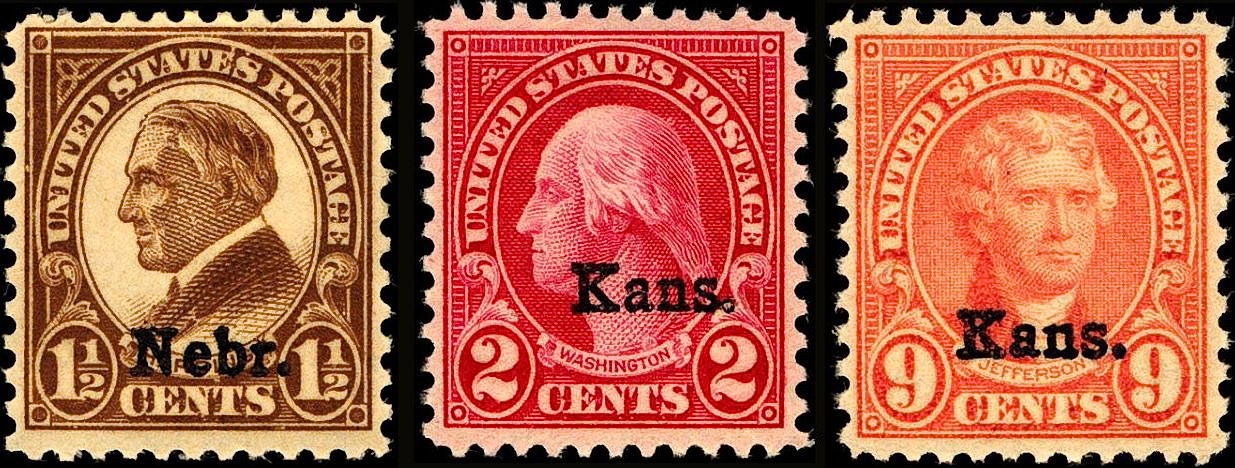
Kans. / Nebr. overprints of 1929

The Kansas-Nebraska Overprints were Regular Issue stamps with an added black colored overprint that read "Kans." or "Nebr." and were issued on May 1, 1929. The letters in the overprint resemble typewriter characters with serifs. Only the denominations of 1 cent to 10 cents were overprinted. The overprints were authorized and added to the 1926–27 printings to counter the rash of stamp thefts suffered by various mid-western rural Post offices. It is estimated that a one-year supply of the Regular Issues received the overprinting. Officials believed that stamps overprinted with the abbreviated names of the individual states would be difficult to sell, or "fence", in other states. The original plan was to produce overprints for all states, and Kansas and Nebraska were selected to initiate the experiment. As events turned out Kansas and Nebraska were the only states to receive this type of overprint. Every Post Office in Kansas and Nebraska received overprinted stamps except for those in Kansas City, Topeka, Wichita, Omaha, and Lincoln: in these larger cities, security at post offices was considered adequate; accordingly, the use of overprinted stamps was deemed necessary only in small, usually rural, post offices. Unfortunately, the rules for selling these overprints resulted in general confusion among both customers and postal clerks: consequently, the overprinted stamps remained in use for less than a year, being discontinued on March 29, 1930. Printed with the Rotary Press, the overprints were issued with perforation size, 11 x 10½. The overprints were added before the stamps received their adhesive gum on their backs. Fakes and forgeries exist for some of the more valuable overprint issues which are usually detected by noting the impression the forged letters leave in the adhesive gum on the reverse of the stamp, as any fraudulent overprinting is always applied after the stamp has received its gum and has been issued.

== Commemorative overprints ==
1928 was the sesquicentennial of Captain Cook's European discovery of Hawaii, and a local celebration was planned. Because it was not a national event the Post Office did not expect to issue a commemorative stamp. As a political and economic compromise, the 2¢ Washington and 5¢ Roosevelt stamps were overprinted "Hawaii 1778-1928". These issues caused considerable confusion as they looked somewhat like precancelled stamps, and so were not accepted at many post offices.

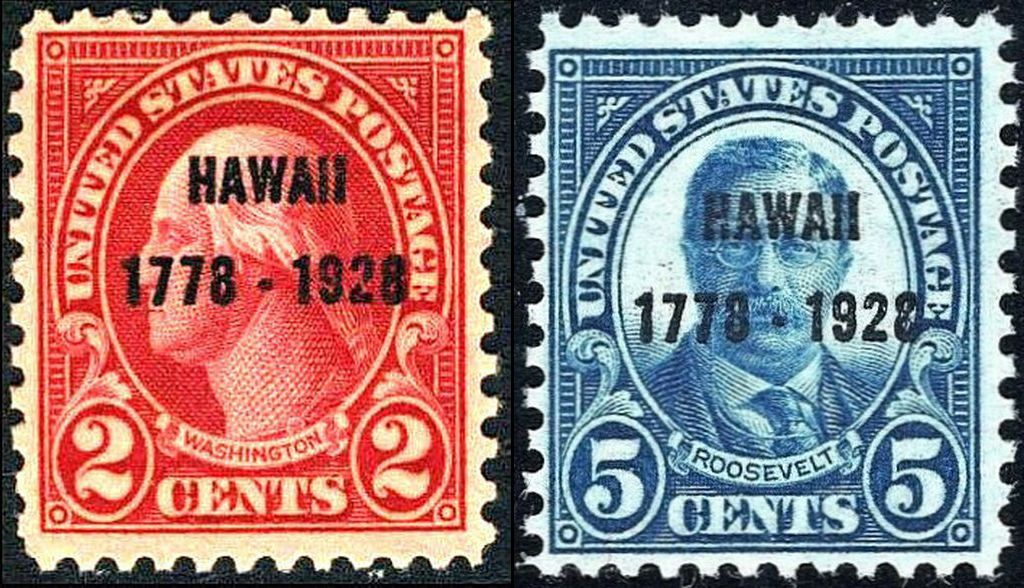
1928 Hawaii overprints

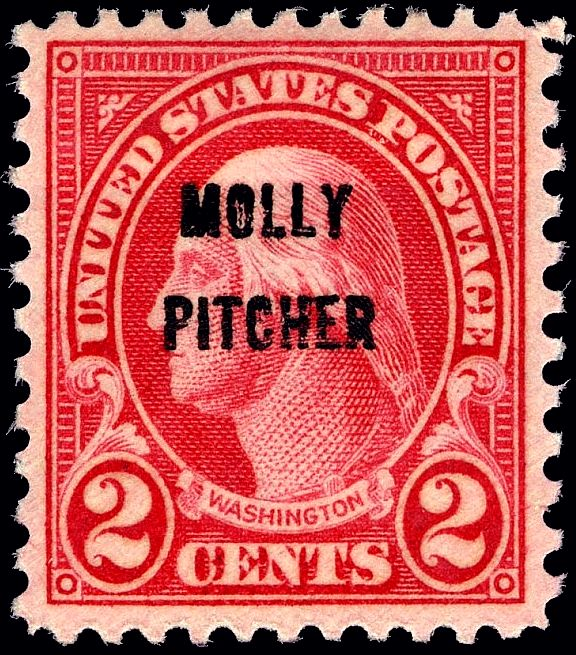
1928 Molly Pitcher

A second attempt at overprinting for commemorative purposes was also done in 1928, for the sesquicentennial of the Battle of Monmouth. This time just the 2¢ Washington received the name of the alleged hero of the battle, Molly Pitcher.

Public reaction to the overprints was generally poor, the consensus being they were cheaply made. No more issues were produced in this or subsequent series.

== Oddities of the issue: coil waste and sheet waste stamps ==
There are a few stamps of this series—all dating from 1923—with features that set them apart from the normal sheet stamps discussed and charted above, although at first glance they may seem identical to the standard products. Ranging from moderately to extremely rare, these are so-called "coil waste" and "sheet waste" issues. That is to say, they were produced from stamps left over after the long rotary-printed rolls of paper had been cut into normal sized coils or sheets (the roll ends being too small to be processed for coils or sheets with the standard equipment). Although these stamps closely resemble the standard flat-plate press sheet issues, their designs are somewhat longer or wider than normal because rotary printing stretches the image slightly.

Coil waste:

- 1¢ and 2¢ stamps perforated 10 vertically by 11 horizontally (made from horizontal coil printings).
- 1¢ and 2¢ stamps perforated 11 (made from horizontal coil printings) Only 106 copies are known of this 1¢ issue.

Sheet waste (made from vertical rotary printings intended for perforated 10 sheets):

- 1¢ rotary press printing, perforated 11 (only 13 copies known)
- 2¢ Harding memorial rotary press printing, perforated 11 (already discussed above; only 50 copies known). Although not technically part of the series, this issue deserves mention here as a contemporary sheet waste example.

These sheet waste stamps are both so rare that their existence was still undiscovered when Max Johl completed his exhaustive three-volume study The United States Postage Stamps of the Twentieth Century in 1937.

== Duration of usage ==
The Regular Issues were released over a ten-year period and, with the exception of one stamp, were the only definitives in general use until 1938 when the Post Office offered the Presidential Issue. The exception, released on June 15, 1932, in anticipation of the impending rate increase on standard letters from 2¢ to 3¢, scheduled for July 6, was a 3¢ Washington regular issue stamp. Rather than designing this hurried production entirely from scratch, the Bureau of Engraving and Printing modified the 2¢ stamp from the Washington Bicentennial Issue which had been released at the beginning of the year, and already looked like a definitive. The Bureau needed only to change the numerals, to remove the stamp's sole commemorative feature (the date ribbons surrounding the portrait) and to print the stamp in the purple ink traditionally used for the 3¢ denomination. The result was that a Washington definitive issue for the normal letter rate—an invariable feature of American postage since 1870—remained continuously available to the public. The 3¢ Lincoln stamp from the 1922 series still sold widely in 1932 but disappeared from post offices the following year, prompting such protests that the Bureau had to reprint it from new plates in early 1934. During the six years following the final release of the regular issue in 1932, a steady stream of 3¢ commemoratives appeared which helped to meet the basic postal needs of the country. The Regular Issues of 1922-1931 are among the longest-running issues of definitive postage, for their duration of common usage (sixteen years) exceeded that of the Washington-Franklin issues of (1908–1922) and is surpassed only by the Presidential Issue, which appeared in 1938 and was only partially replaced in 1954, with several denominations remaining available for several years thereafter.

== See also ==
U.S. stamp locator and NaV-AiD
United States stamp–related categories on Wikimedia Commons:
- History of the United States on stamps
- Presidents of the United States on stamps
- George Washington on stamps
- Thomas Jefferson on stamps
- Benjamin Franklin on stamps
- Andrew Jackson on stamps
- Abraham Lincoln on stamps
- Ulysses S. Grant on stamps
- People of the United States on stamps

- Stamps of the United States
- Commemorative stamps of the United States
- Definitive stamps of the United States
- Airmail stamps of the United States
- Revenue stamps of the United States
- Stamps of the Confederate States of America
- Flags of the United States on stamps
- Stamps of the Confederate States of America
- Stamps of the American Civil War
- Stamps of the Canal Zone

- Stamps of the United States 1860–1869
- Stamps of the United States 1847–1859
- Stamps of the United States 1870–1880
- Stamps of the United States 1881–1890
- Stamps of the United States 1891–1900
- Stamps of the United States 1901–1910
- Stamps of the United States 1911–1920
- Stamps of the United States 1921–1930
- Stamps of the United States 1931–1940
- Stamps of the United States 1941–1950
- Stamps of the United States 1951–1960
- Stamps of the United States 1961–1970
- Stamps of the United States 1971–1977
- Stamps of the United States 1978–1980

- U.S. historical landmarks on stamps
- U.S. territories on stamps

- Stamps designed by Charles R. Chickering
- Stamps designed by Clair Aubrey Houston

General categories on Wikimedia Commons:

(Some of these categories contain images of stamps not issued by the United States.)
- Aircraft on stamps
- Automobiles on stamps
- Birds on stamps
- Buildings on stamps
- Dogs on stamps
- Elephants on stamps
- Horses on stamps
- Maps on stamps
- Sailing ships on stamps
- Ships on stamps
- Trains on stamps
- Red stamps
- Blue stamps
- Brown stamps
- Green stamps
- Purple stamps
- Black stamps
- Yellow stamps
- Orange stamps
- US multi-colored stamps

See also (Wikipedia articles):

- Presidents of the United States on U.S. postage stamps
- Washington–Franklin Issues
- US Regular Issues of 1922–1931
- Champion of Liberty commemorative stamps
- Presidents of the United States on U.S. postage stamps
- Postage stamps and postal history of the United States
- Stamp collecting
- US stamp locator

Preceded by Washington-Franklin Issues	US Definitive postage stamps 1922–1931	Succeeded by Presidential Issue
