= Commemoration of the American Civil War on postage stamps =

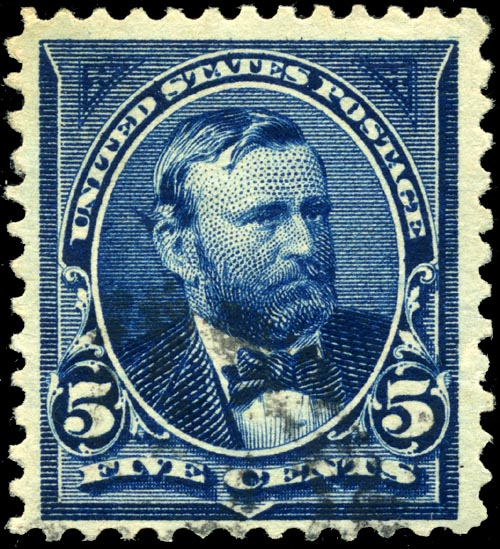
Ulysses S. Grant
Union commander

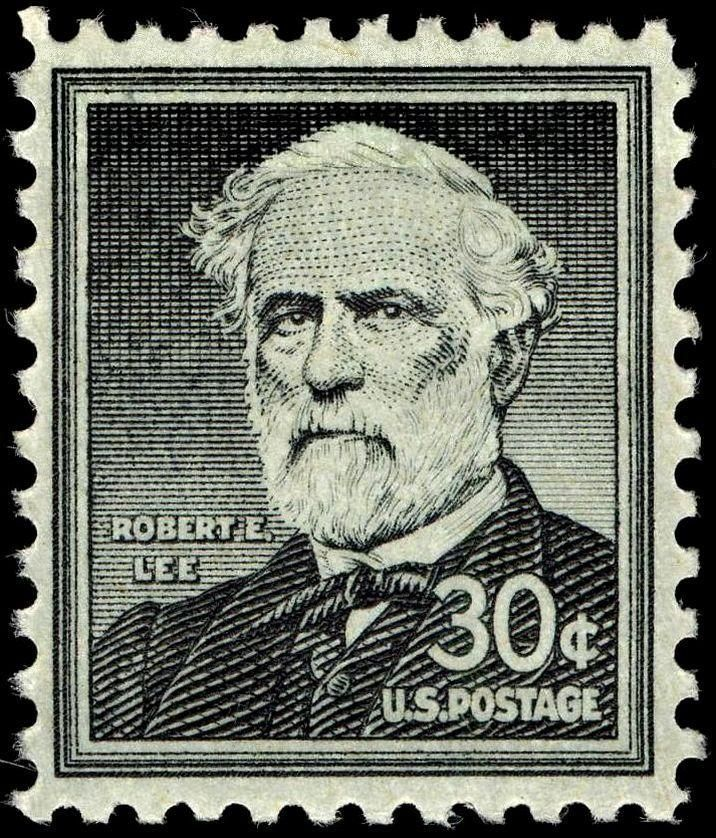
Robert E. Lee
Confederate commander

The Commemoration of the American Civil War on postage stamps concerns both the actual stamps and covers used during the American Civil War, and the later postage celebrations. The latter include commemorative stamp issues devoted to the actual events and personalities of the war, as well as definitive issues depicting many noteworthy individuals who participated in the era's crucial developments.

== Civil War stamps ==
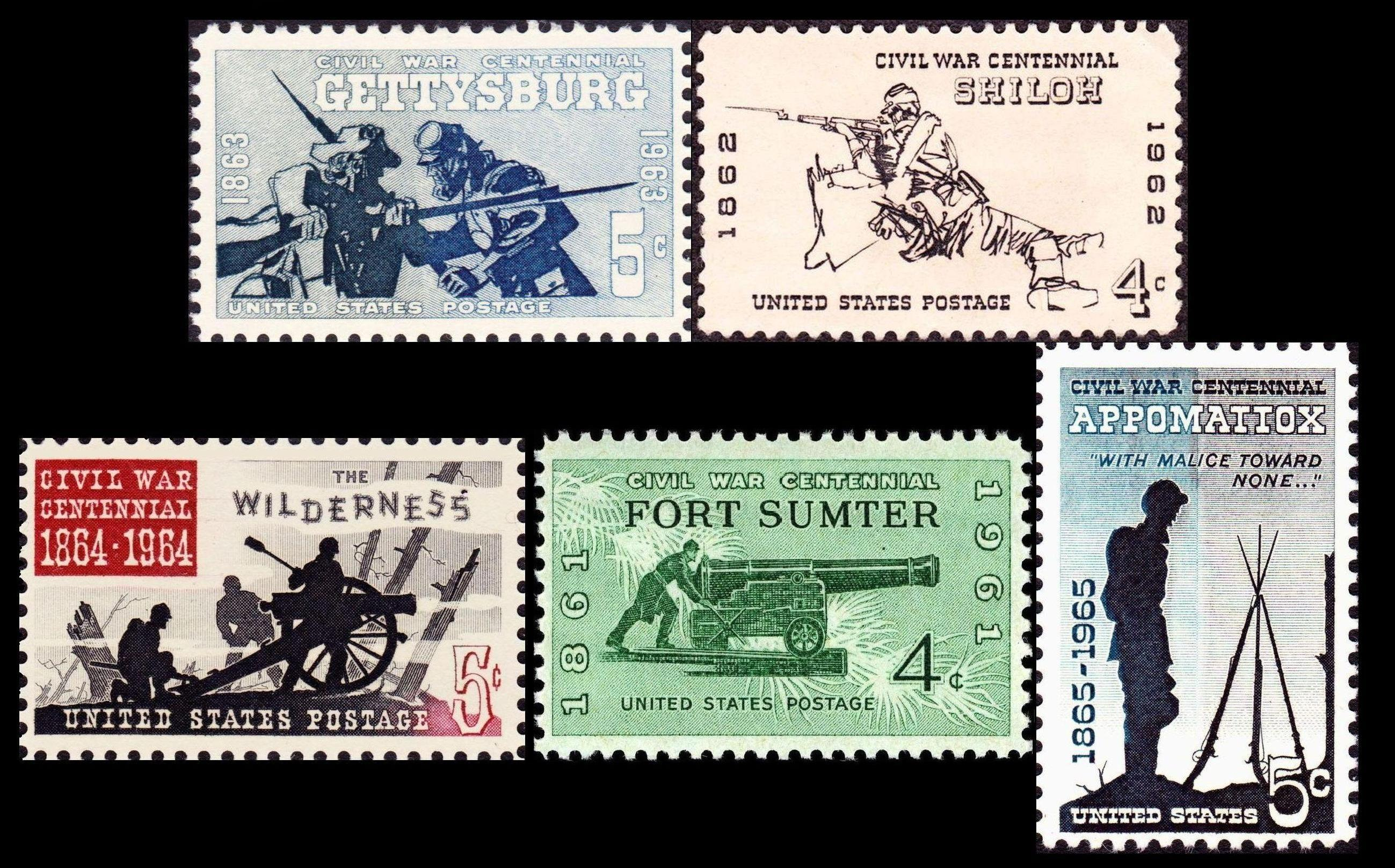
Between 1961 and 1965 the USPS released commemoratives on the 100th anniversary of five important battles.

During the Civil War, heroes of the previous national period were featured on the stamps of both sides of the conflict: Washington, Jefferson and Jackson. Following reunification, and during many decades thereafter, sporadic U. S. definitive issues appeared in honor of Civil War-related statesmen and military leaders—exclusively those, however, who had supported the Union cause.

Their Confederate counterparts remained unrecognized on American stamps until 1937, when Lee and Jackson were included among the Civil War generals and admirals pictured in the commemorative Army-Navy issues, a series promoted by President Franklin D. Roosevelt (himself a stamp enthusiast). Even then, however, with the war some seven decades in the past, this inclusion of a stamp honoring Confederate generals proved controversial. After the issue was announced in May 1936, a false rumor spread that Jefferson Davis was to be portrayed along with the two officers, and on June 11 the following Associated Press dispatch appeared in the New York Sun:

G. A. R. Opposes Honors For Lee. Denounces Plan to Issue Stamp Series. — At Syracuse, June 11, (A. P.) A proposition to honor Robert E. Lee, Stonewall Jackson and Jefferson Davis, on postage stamps issued bearing their likeness, was denounced by thirty-eight aging veterans of the Civil War, attending the Seventieth Annual Encampment of the United States department of the Grand Army of the Republic.

Later the proposed Lee-Jackson stamp was deplored in the Ohio state legislature. After its issue, moreover, southerners inveighed against it as well, objecting that Lee’s right shoulder displayed two stars rather than three, in effect demoting him to the rank of Lieutenant General (this mistake occurred as the result of a design change). Word spread that an act of Congress to recall the stamp was in preparation, but no such legislation materialized. Indeed, given that the conflict remained so touchy a subject, it is not surprising that the Civil War and its various aspects—apart from a small number of people associated with it—was left virtually uncommemorated on stamps for almost a century.

This article follows the convention of the 1995 Civil War commemoration of 20 stamps related to the Civil War; civilians of the Civil War have been pictured beginning with the definitive issue for Abraham Lincoln after his assassination. Notable people who were Civil War participants have been included in this article including inventors, authors, and subsequent U.S. presidents.

=== U.S.A. and C.S.A. postal service ===
Note: A brief note as to the significance of each subject as it is related to the American Civil War is included by each stamp and cover.

The generations who led and fought the American Civil War were born into an independent United States and they would determine whether it could continue as a united republic. Steam power on land and sea had begun to shrink the world and the telegraph moved information at the speed of electricity. In 1851, Congress reduced rates for typical uses such as printed matter to one cent, and three-cent letter postage versus five or ten-cent rates. Postal distances for each rate were extended as much as ten times, for example, from three hundred to 3,000 miles. Their world was filled with mechanized innovations that included the first U.S. postage stamps produced from machine perforation to replace the cutting tasks which had been done manually. These were accompanied by innovations in paper types and printing techniques.

Confederate stamps were generally issued imperforate to be manually cut. (Note: A small number of ten cent stamps were perforated and released for use by the Confederate Post Office Department in 1864, but perforation quality was often poor and the experiment was abandoned as unsuccessful "10-cent Jefferson Davis, Type II". Smithsonian National Postal Museum..) Moreover, while U. S. stamps had always been steel engraved, the first Confederate issues did not employ this state-of-the-art technique, instead being lithographed (1861) and typographed (1862), before steel engraving finally was adopted in 1863. More innovations in technology and organization would develop during wartime. The north-south conflict exploding into war also ripped the nation's communication system in two. The postal system once meant to unify the country through the dissemination of information was used instead used to solidify the break.

During the decades preceding the war, the American Anti-Slavery Society sought to promote abolition by educating the populace on the evils of slavery, and for that purpose, mailed thousands upon thousands of anti-slavery tracts. The response in the south led the nation to the edge of disaster, only temporarily eased by the Missouri Compromise, and the Compromise of 1850. But the post roads and routes established by Congress in the late 1850s brought a stronger southern mail system, and with it a rising spirit of southern nationalism. Southern public opinion began to boil over as through the southern mails, the fiery pamphlets of the Southern Rights Association other agitators roused a Southern national sentiment. To compound the irony, solidifying of southern opinion was achieved through a mail service that never paid its own way, subsidized largely at northern expense.

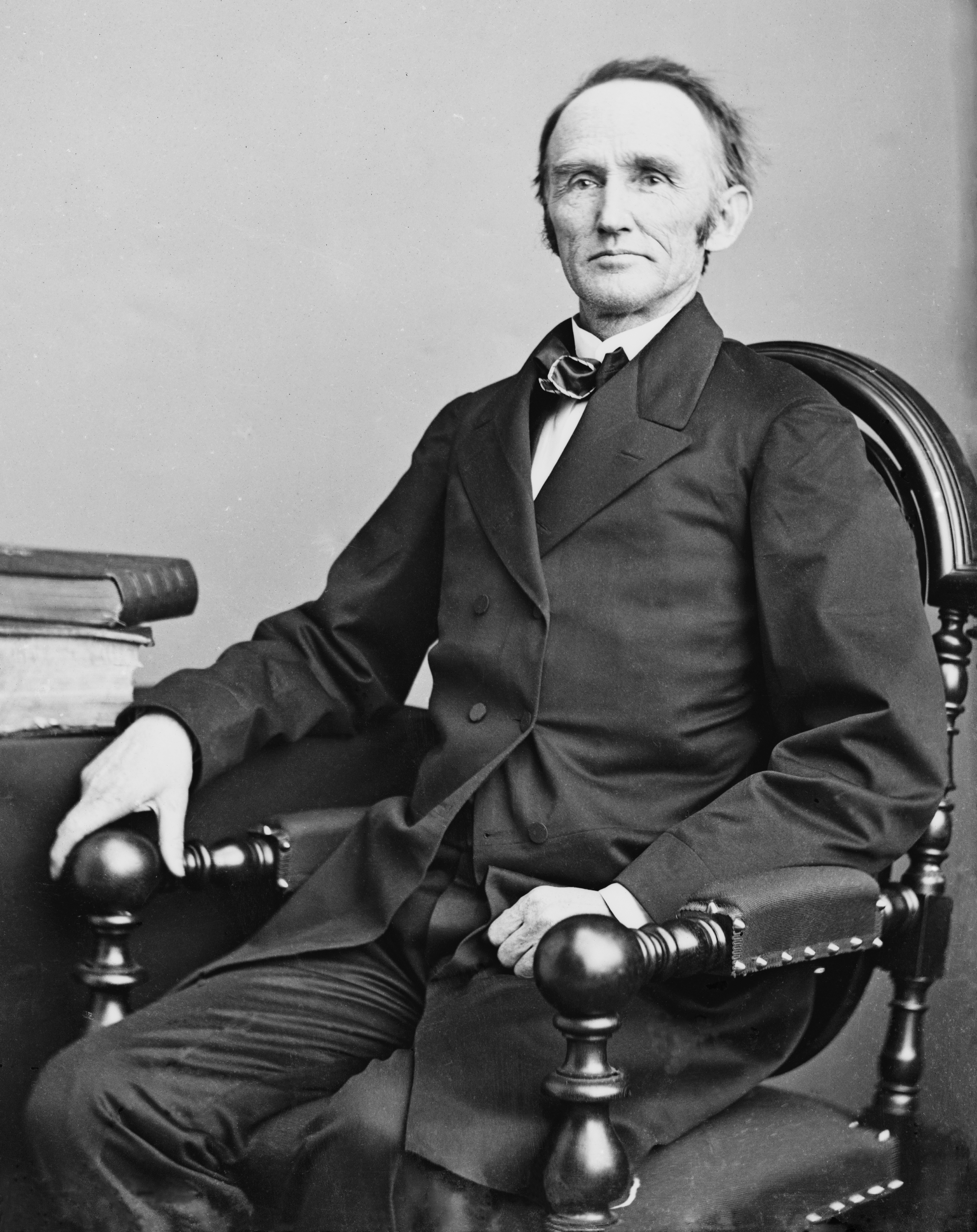
Montgomery Blair
United States Postmaster

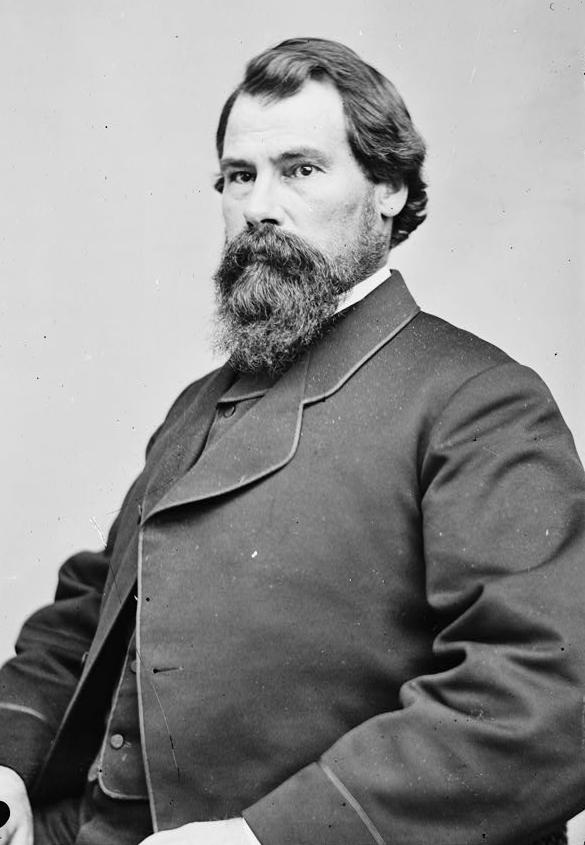
John H. Reagan
Confederate Postmaster

The secession state by state was at first peaceful, with South Carolina (December 24, 1860) followed by Mississippi, Florida, Alabama, Georgia, Louisiana, and Texas. Most Americans still felt that the issues driving "secession" resolutions would be resolved quickly. The United States Government still considered these jurisdictions part of the Union, and allowed continued use of the U.S. Postal System for mail service within those states and to outside destinations. Forming the Confederacy within a month or less brought about a change in postal policy.

But at the onset of the American Civil War, Lincoln's postmaster general, Montgomery Blair faced a federal postal system regionally disabled by seceding states and disloyal postmasters. To prevent possible fraud potentially amounting to $270,000 in postage and stamped envelopes held in the South, the existing stamps were withdrawn and demonetized, and a new series of stamps was hurriedly issued. With the previous contract ending June 10, 1861, the Post Office Department signed a contract with the National Bank Note Company of New York City. Loyal postmasters in seceded states returned stamps to the Department. The new stamps were in use across the Union by mid-August 1861 with the same denominations and honoring the same people as the previous issue, but all of the designs had changed. Unlike most political appointees, Montgomery Blair took charge of the department, organizing an efficient system for the army and navy and abolishing the franking privilege for postmasters. He originated the new practices of free mail delivery and the sorting of mail on railway cars. He developed the return-receipt system for accountability, and innovated the money order system for soldiers to send and receive money from the field. Blair sponsored the first International Postal Congress in Paris in 1863.

President Jefferson Davis had appointed John Henninger Reagan on March 6, 1861, to head the new Confederate States of America Post-office Department. The United States Post Office Department continued to handle the mail of the seceded states until June 1 when the Confederate Post office took over collection and delivery throughout the Confederacy, remaining in operation for the duration of the Civil War. The most immediate concerns of the Confederate postmaster general was the organization of his department and providing for the payment of postage so that it would become self-financing. While the recalled U.S. postage could no longer be used to carry the mail by the U.S. Post Office, the Confederacy did use "appropriated" United States postal stationery for some time. General Reagan claimed he never conferred official authority on postmasters to issue interim, "provisional" stamps, but they filled a need in the absence of national Confederate stamps (which were not issued until October, 1861) and stamped envelopes.

=== U.S.A. and C.S.A. stamps ===
The eight United States postage stamps issued in 1861 pictured Washington (5), Franklin (2) and Jefferson (1), and envelopes signaled the sacredness of the Constitution and rebellion as treason. Confederate stamps pictured Washington, Jefferson, Jackson and Jefferson Davis (a stamp was printed depicting John C. Calhoun but was never put into use). Confederate envelopes focused on the Confederate flag and Jefferson Davis to foster a growth of Confederate nationalism, characterizing Lincoln as the anti-constitutionalist, the North as disloyal and the Southern attempt at nationhood as a renewal of the American Revolution. In the struggle for preserving their rights and liberties, George Washington was on their side.

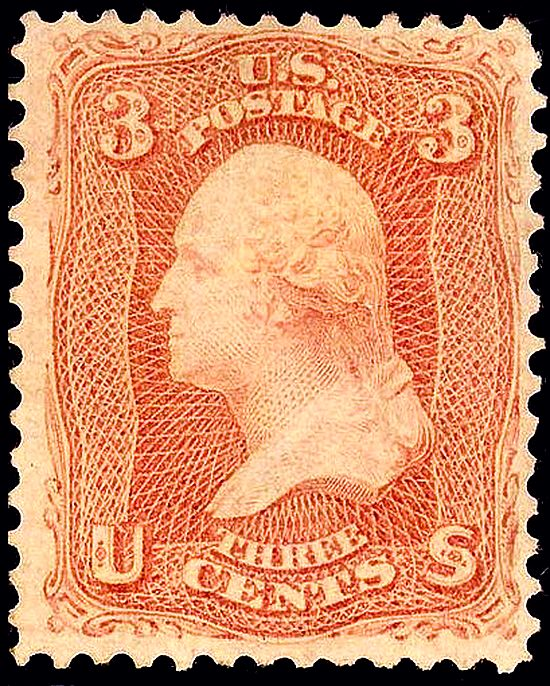
George Washington
3 cent USA 1861

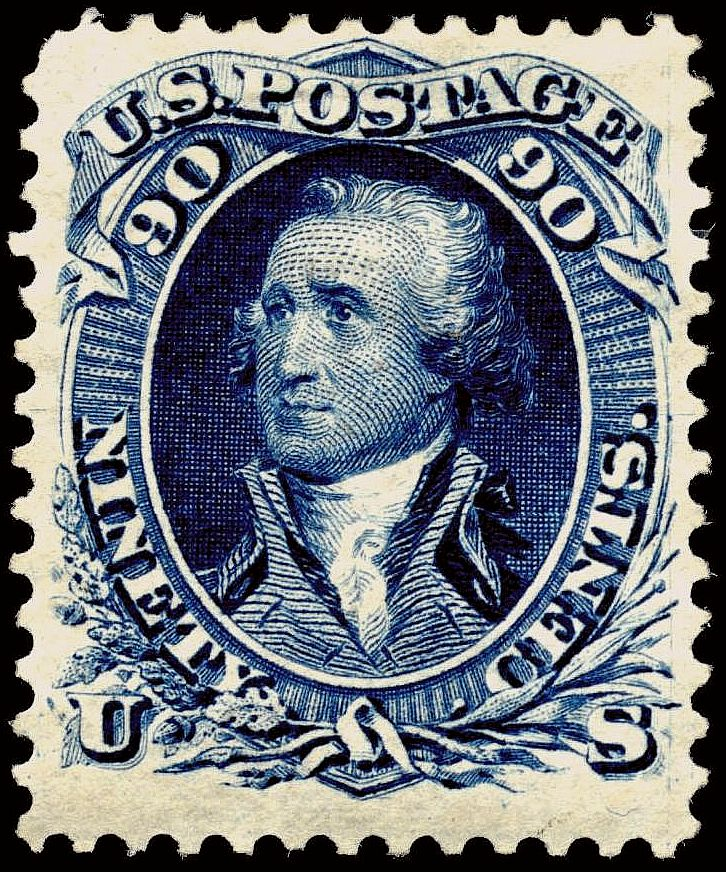
George Washington
90 cent USA 1861

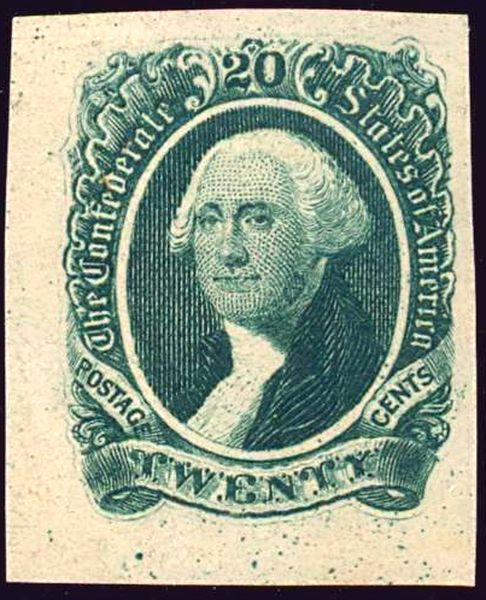
George Washington
20 cent CSA 1863

- George Washington was revered in the Union as the Father of his country".
- In the Confederacy he was memorialized as the Founding Father who defeated an occupying empire.

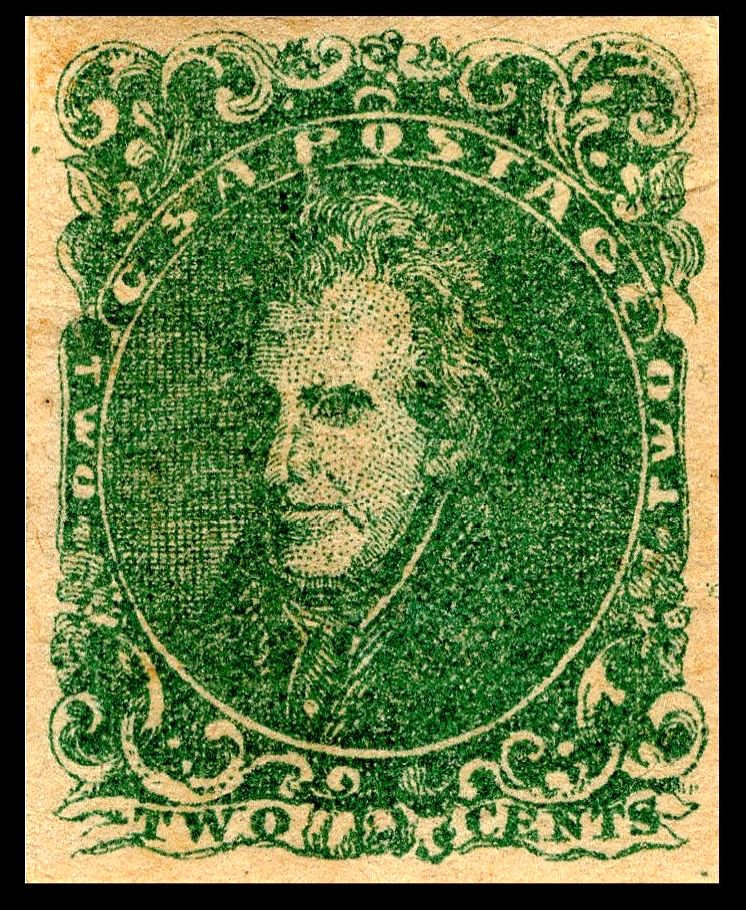
Andrew Jackson
2 cent CSA 1862

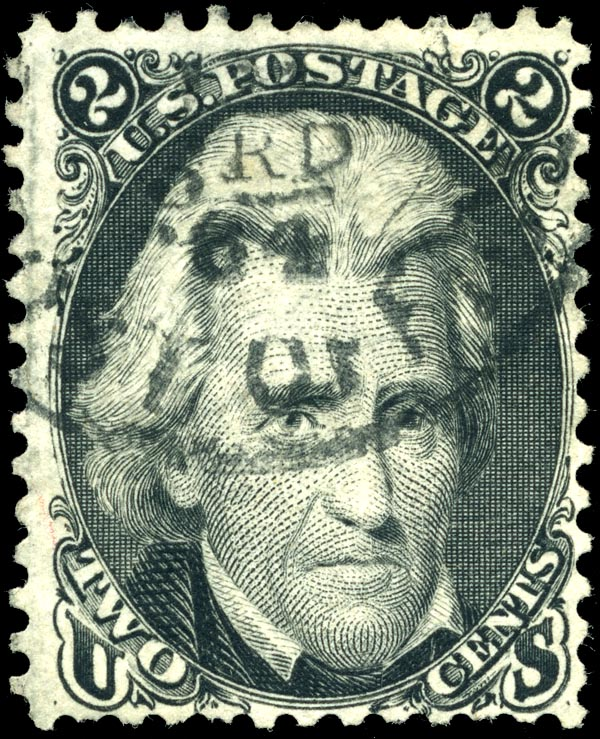
Andrew Jackson
2 cent USA 1863

- Andrew Jackson was remembered in the Union as the president who upheld the Constitution and faced down the South Carolina Nullifiers.
- In the Confederacy he was the general who turned back the invader as the "hero of New Orleans".

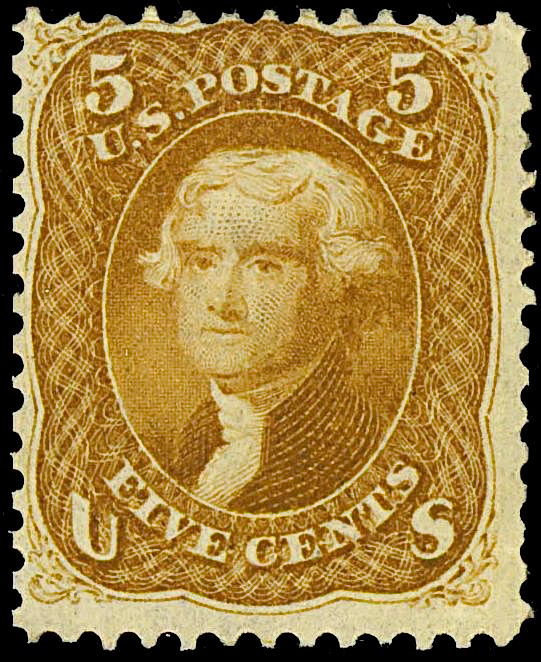
Thomas Jefferson
5 cent USA 1861

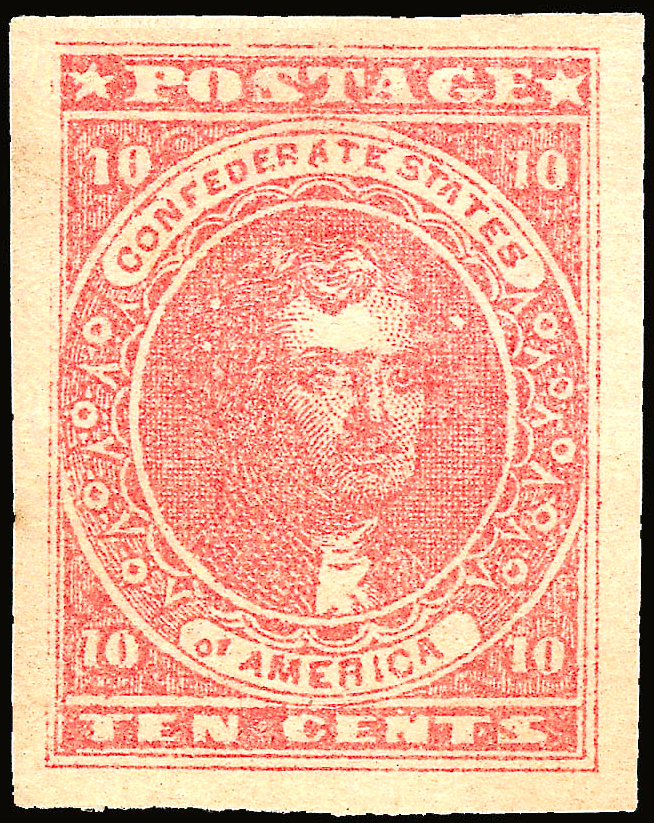
Thomas Jefferson
10 cent CSA 1862

- Thomas Jefferson was revered in the Union as one of the nation's principal architects, with Abraham Lincoln hailing him as "the most distinguished politician in our history."
- The Confederacy claimed Jefferson as a champion of states' rights, seeing his slavery-based establishment at Monticello as an avatar of the Southern way of life.

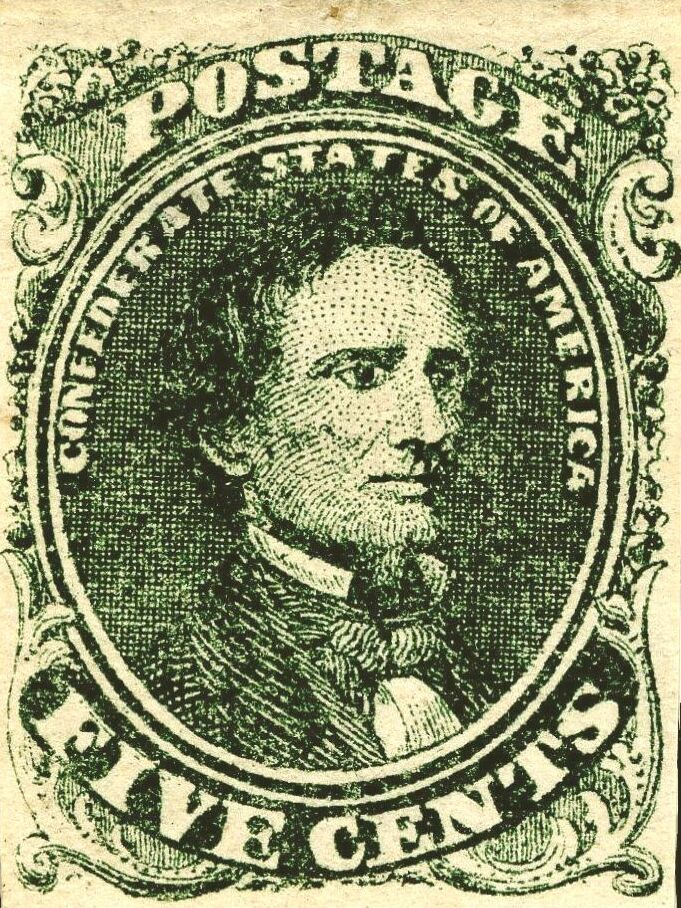
Jefferson Davis
5 cent CSA 1861

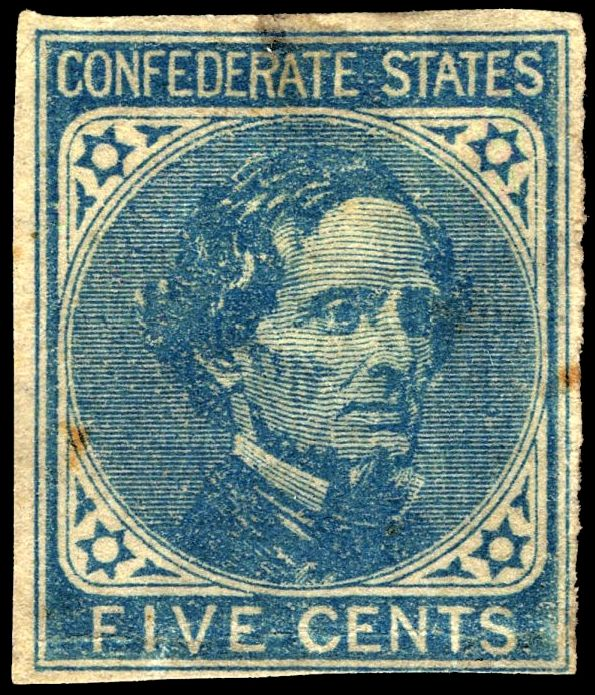
Jefferson Davis
5 cent CSA 1862

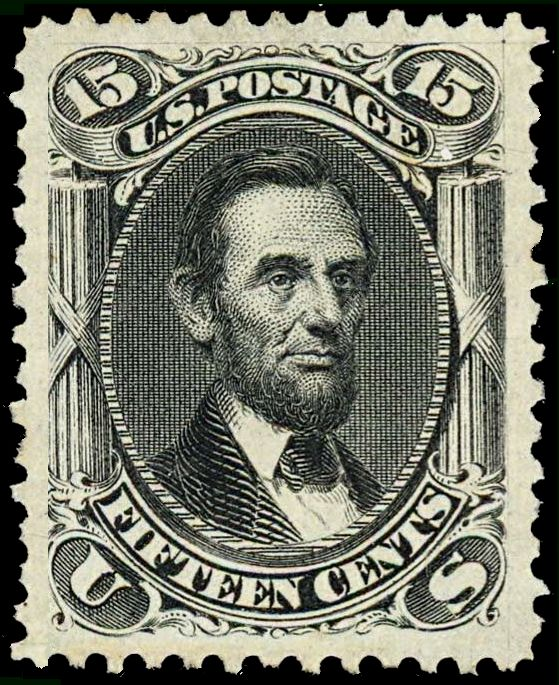
Abraham Lincoln
15 cent USA 1866

- Confederate President Jefferson Davis is pictured frequently on stamps as a symbol of national unity.
- United States President Abraham Lincoln is not featured until in memoriam one year after his assassination. It is considered the first U.S. commemorative stamp.

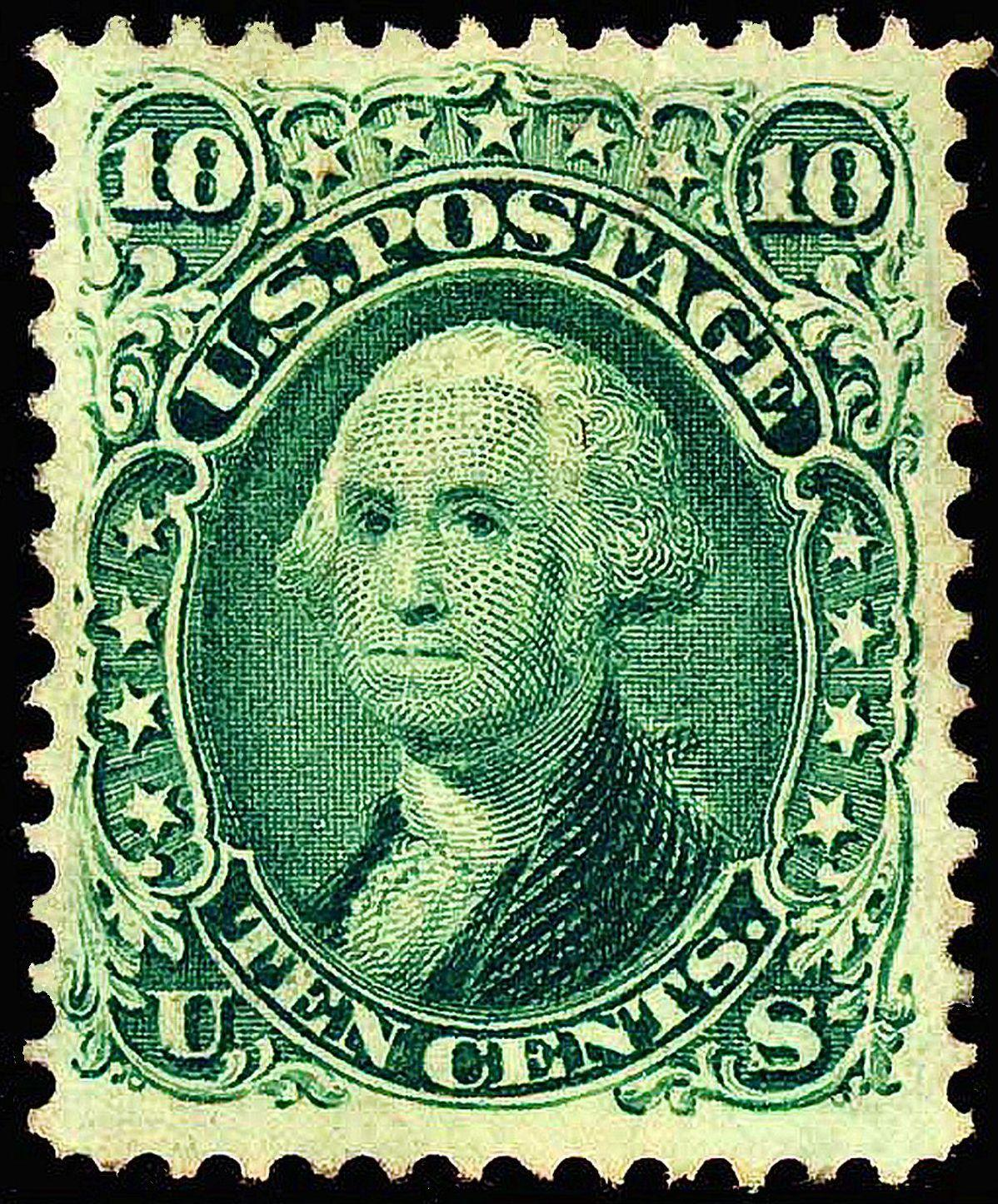
George Washington
10 cent USA 1861

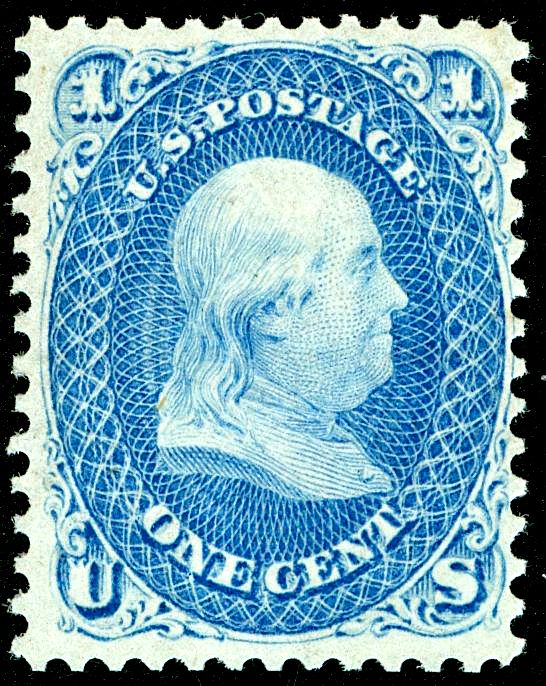
Benjamin Franklin
1 cent USA 1861

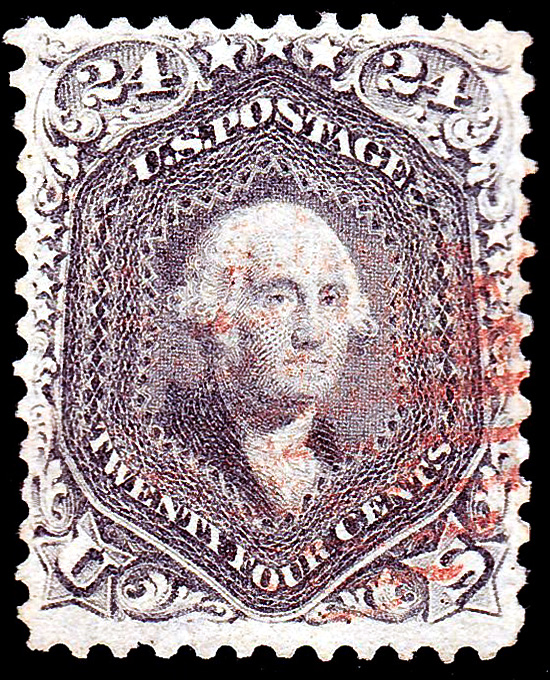
George Washington
24 cent USA 1862

United States regular issue stamps during the Civil War.

In 1861, Postmaster General Montgomery Blair cut off mail service to any state in rebellion. Confederate postage was not recognized by U.S. post offices, and postmasters forwarded mail addressed into the Confederacy to the Dead Letter Office, to be returned to senders.

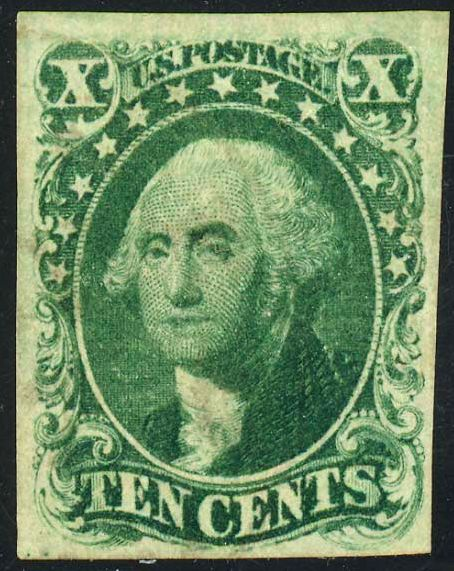
George Washington
10 cent USA pre-1861

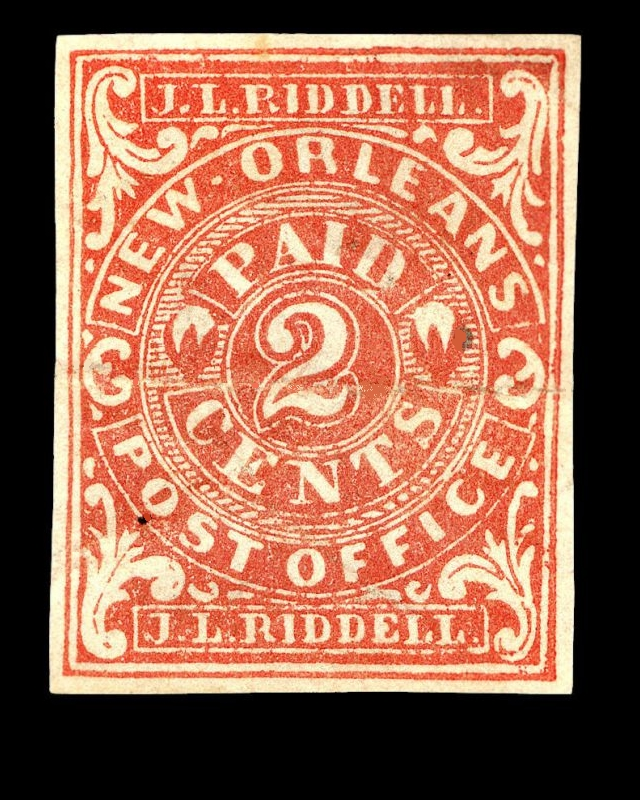
New Orleans Provisional
2 cent CSA 1862

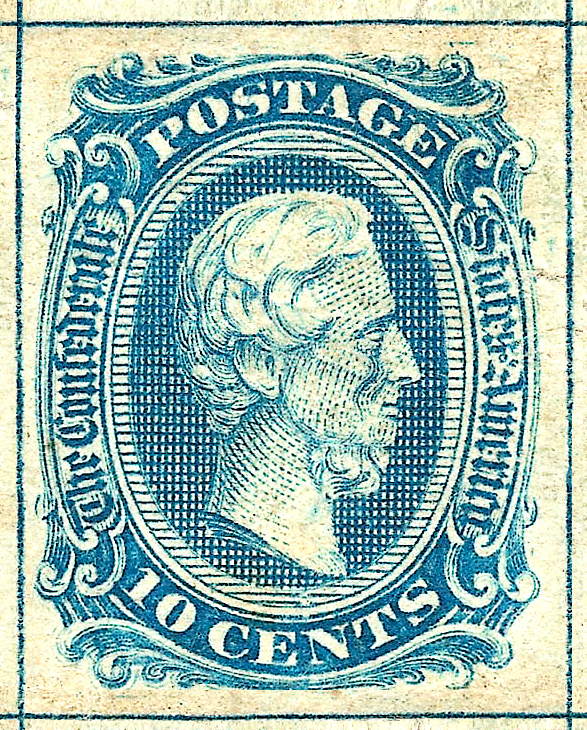
Jefferson Davis
10 cent CSA 1863

The Confederacy used U.S. stamps pre-1861 with Roman numerals, provisional stamps and regular issue.

Postmaster Reagan placed 8,535 of the nation's 28,586 post offices under his control, and initially all postal business was conducted with U.S. money and postage stamps. Until Confederate stamps became available, some local postmasters issued provisional stamps or marked mail "paid" by hand.

=== Contemporary Civil War covers ===
During the Civil War, private sector printers throughout the North developed cultural heroes who complemented and expanded the galaxy of official heroes found on stamps. Patriotic covers honored ordinary middle-class individuals, both civilian and military. Military theme covers also commemorate ordinary citizen soldiers. This "democratizing" in American popular icons contributed to a more explicit democratic nationalism.

The Union flag was everywhere. In a way rarely seen before the war, mottoes and verses emphasize that the flag symbolized the "Vox Populi," the right of the people to rule. Uncle Sam became a widespread symbol of the nation, as well as figures like President Lincoln and General McClellan. The distribution of tens of thousands of Union Patriotic Covers through the postal system enhanced interconnectedness of the nation and the homogeneity of popular culture, with profound implications for post-war society.

Illustrated stationery reveals the strong emotions generated by the Civil War. In the North envelopes bearing patriotic illustrations appeared even before hostilities broke out.

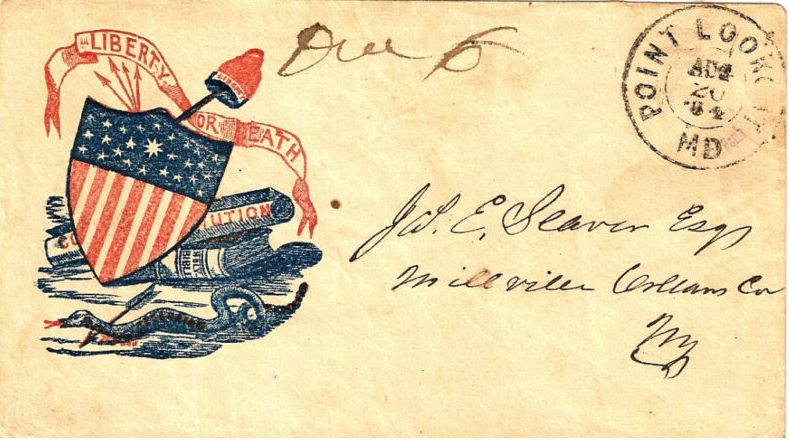
Union patriotic cover

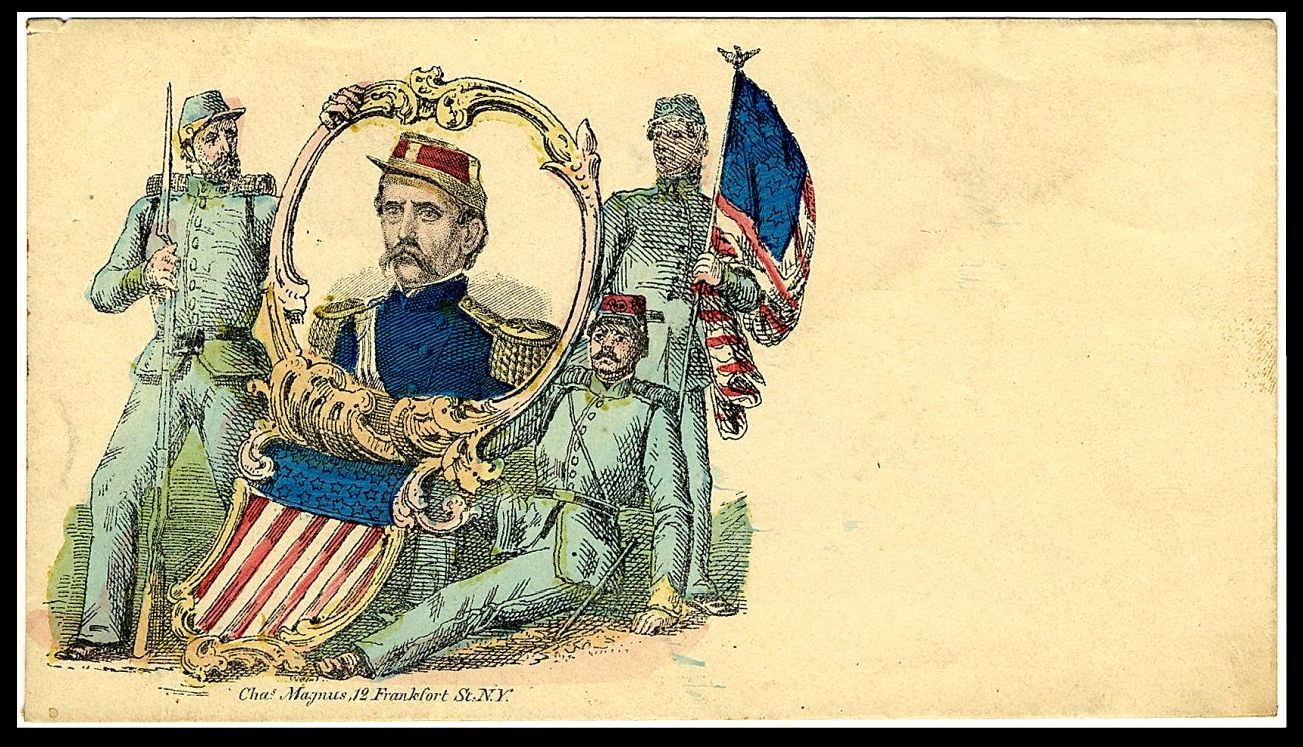
Union patriotic cover

- Union shield with Liberty Cap, Constitution and Bible
- Union commander, crest, soldiers with flag

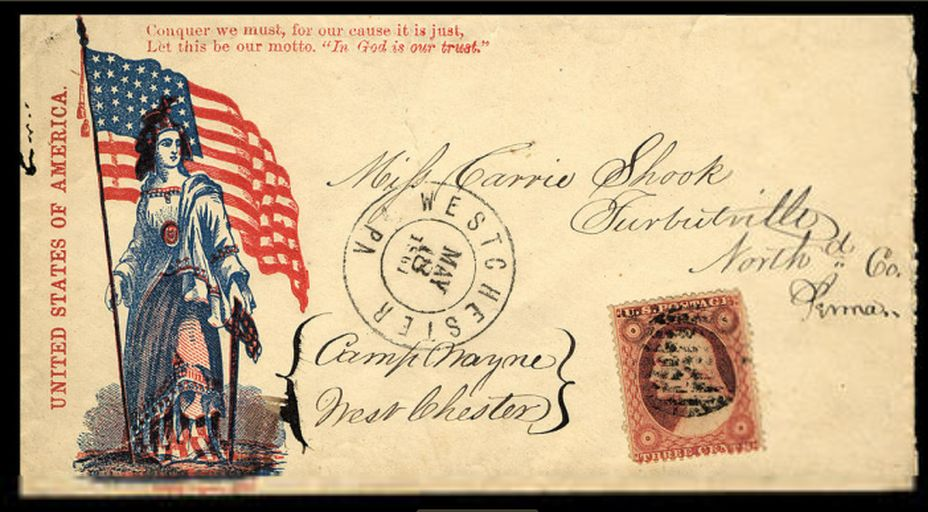
Union patriotic cover

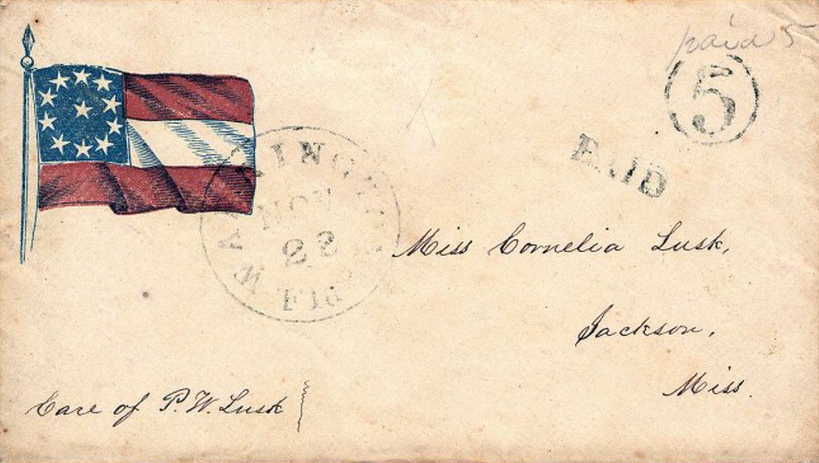
Confederate patriotic cover

- Freedom atop the U.S. Capitol holding Union flag. "Conquer we must, for our cause it is just, Let this be our motto, 'In God is our trust.'"
- Confederate flag in three colors.

Soon after the war began, Southern stationers quickly marketed patriotic envelopes picturing flags, cannons, political leaders, slogans, soldiers, and caricatures, among other war-related themes.

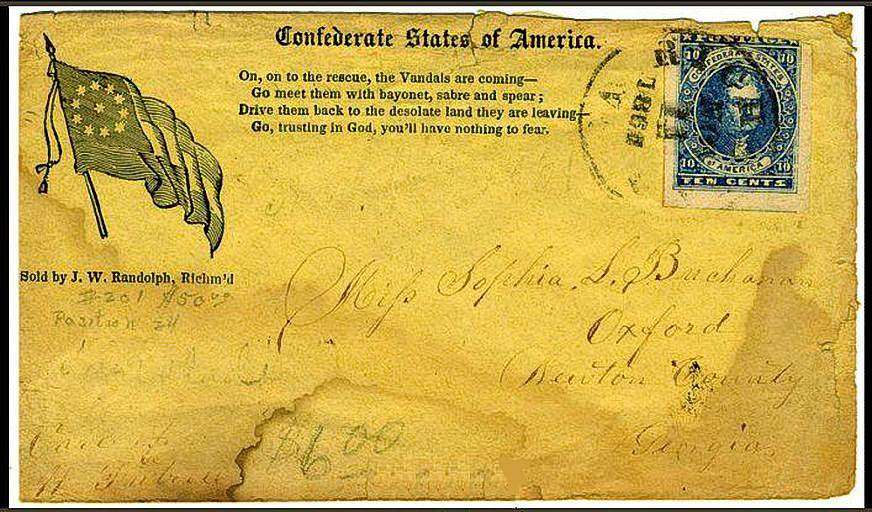
Confederate patriotic cover

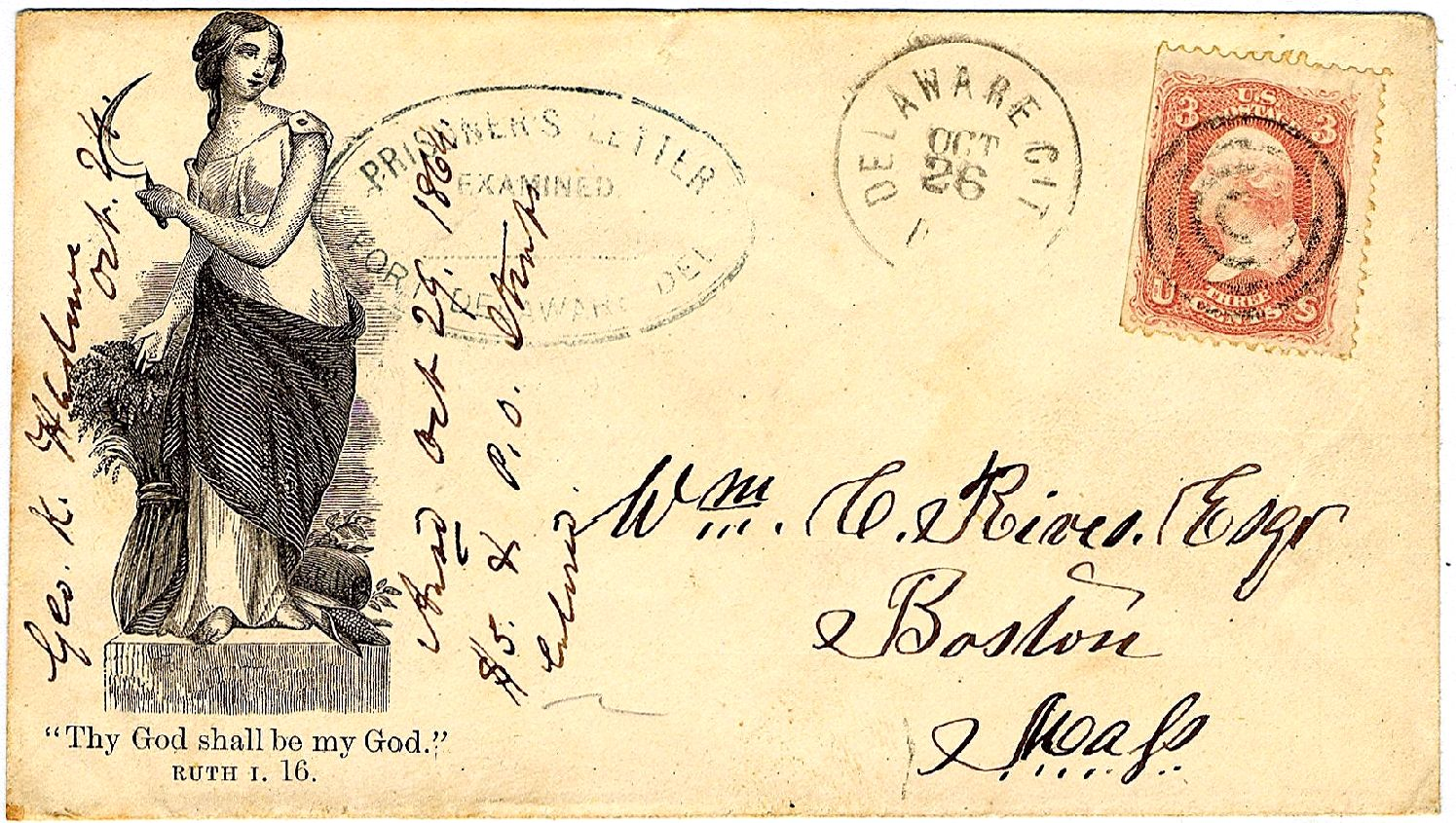
Confederate's POW cover

- Confederate flag in black ink. "On, on to the rescue, the Vandals are coming—Go meet them with bayonet, sabre and spear; Drive them back to the desolate land they are leaving—Go, trusting in God, you'll have nothing to fear."
- POW letter with Biblical inscription, "Thy God shall be my God." Ruth I.16.

Union forces began blockading southern ports in April 1861, requiring mail to be carried on blockade runners or routed through foreign posts. Without postal treaties with foreign governments, Confederate letters were carried as private "ship" mail. They were charged the inland rates plus two cents, which was paid to the ship's master.

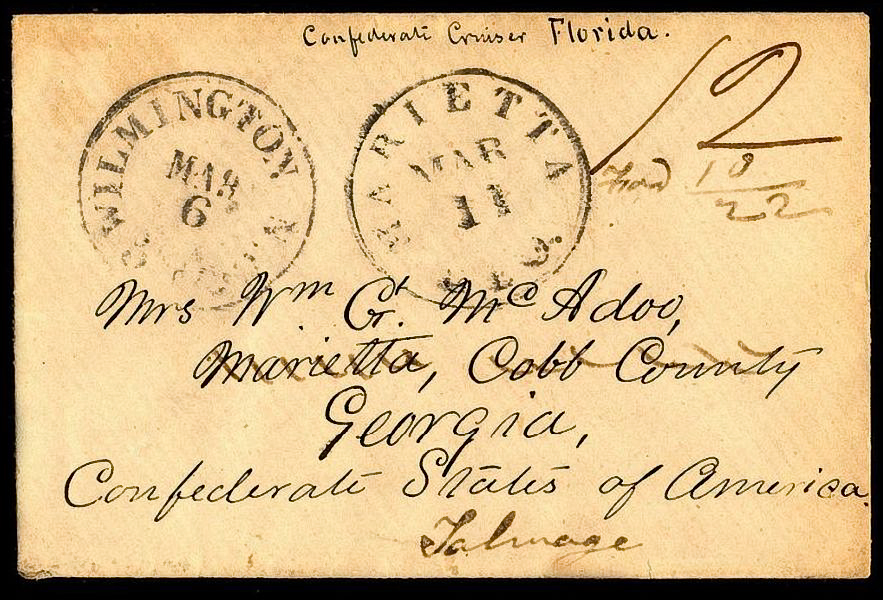
Confederate blockade cover c. 1863

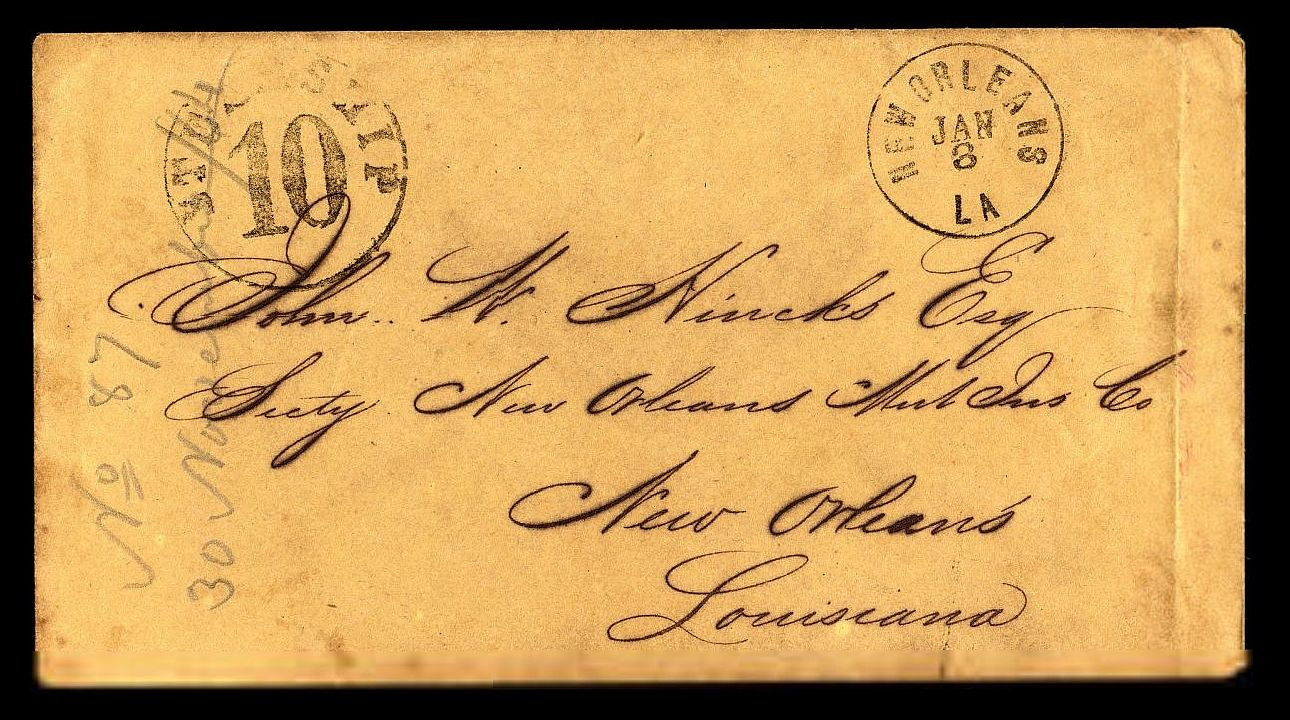
Confederate blockade cover 1865

- Confederate blockade cover carried aboard the CSS Florida, outfitted in Mobile AL. Wilmington NC and Marietta GA postmark.
- Cover stamped "steamship", probably placed aboard a blockade runner and handed over in Nassau to a ship bound for New Orleans, then treated as an unpaid incoming ship letter and marked with ten cents due.

The "Gilded generation" born 1822 to 1842, defined the western adventurer of today's imagination. They were the youthful mining 49er in California, the Pony Express rider before and during the Civil War, bringing in Nevada as a state in October 1864.

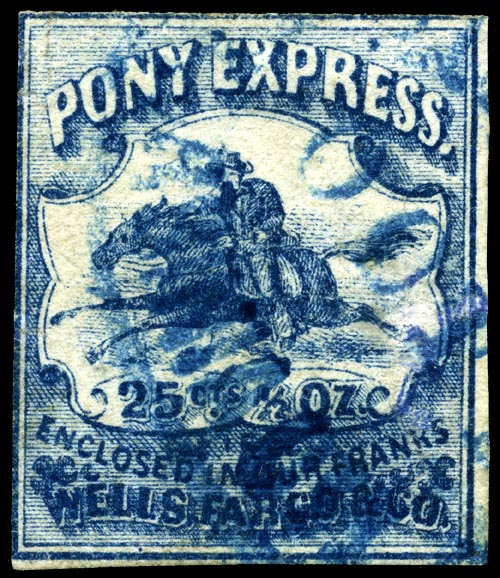
Wells Fargo stamp

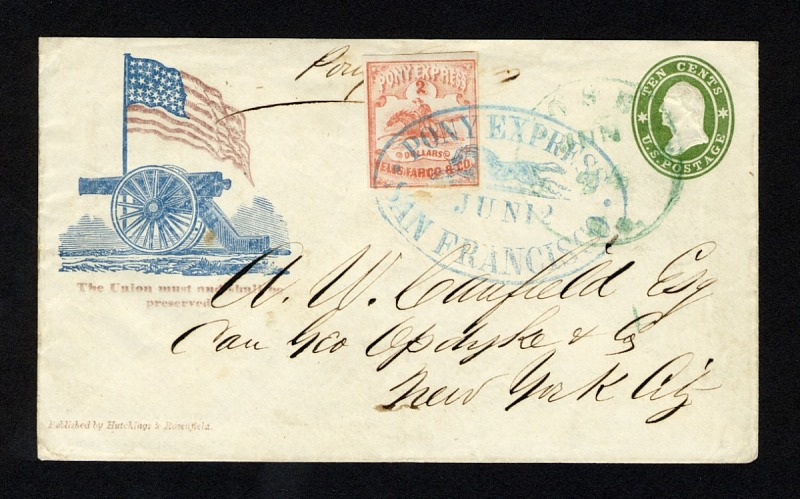
Patriotic cover sent by Pony Express

- The Pony Express served east-west communications between telegraph stations during the first months of the Civil War. Here a Wells Fargo stamp placed on an envelope in addition to U.S. postage.
- Union patriotic cover with Pony Express stamp and U.S. postage.

As Union troops occupied rebel territory, federal mail service was restored, amounting to almost 500 routes by the end of 1865. Almost half of the post offices in the South had been returned to Federal service by the end of 1866.

== Subsequent commemoratives and definitives ==
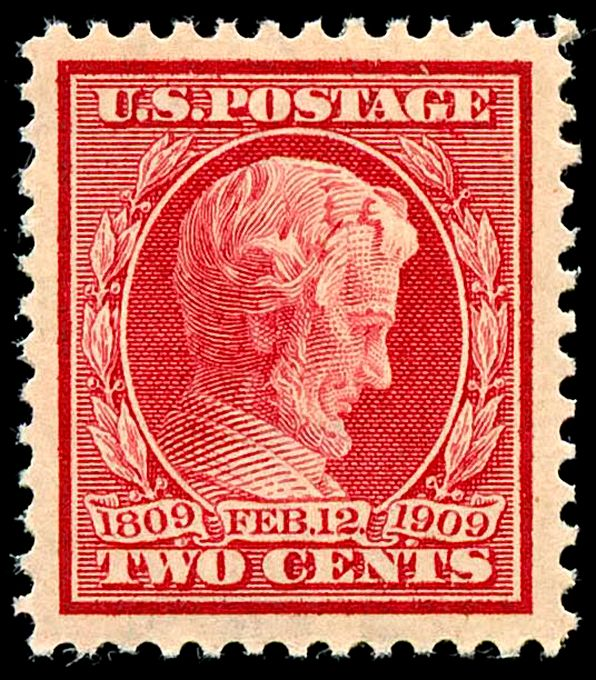
1909

In the years immediately following the Civil War, the U. S. post office did not offer commemorative stamps at all; and the commemoratives that began appearing in the 1890s were devoted almost exclusively to international trade fairs. The sole exception, the "Lincoln Memorial" (1909), was the first stamp officially designated as a commemorative ever issued in honor of a Civil War figure. After World War I, however, topics were greatly expanded to include noteworthy individuals, places, events and innovations. Commemoratives have communicated an idealized and patriotic vision of the American past, but contests for recognition on a federal stamp also reflect contemporary fights over definitions of U.S. citizenship. Principal actors in the Civil War are arranged into categories of Union officers, Confederate officers, the Common Soldier and Civilians. Events in the Civil War expand beyond Battles to include Reconstruction, Culture, and Technology. Famous people and the Civil War include authors, presidents, and a separate section on Abraham Lincoln.

=== Principal actors in the Civil War ===
Some groups have seen commemoratives as holding out a romanticized view of America. Others have promoted issues as a part of grander strategies fighting for social and political equality. Commemorative committees, business leaders, and politicians have actively pursued federal postage stamps celebrating regional anniversaries held at battlefields. Others sought stamps honoring military, cultural, and political heroes, such as Robert E. Lee, Susan B. Anthony, and Frederick Douglass.

While commemoratives had honored Civil War figures and events in such stamp issues as the Army Navy 1937 series and the Centennial celebration of 1961–1965, comprehensive coverage of the conflict did not appear until 1995, when U.S. Postal Service issued its most ambitious commemorative of the Civil War to date in photogravure sheets of 120 in six panes of 20. The four events pictured were Battle of Hampton Roads between the Monitor and Merrimac (Virginia), Battle of Shiloh, Battle of Chancellorsville and Battle of Gettysburg. Presidents included Jefferson Davis and Abraham Lincoln. Union officers included Ulysses S. Grant, David Farragut, Winfield Hancock, and William T. Sherman. Confederate officers included Robert E. Lee, Raphael Semmes, Stand Watie, Joseph E. Johnston and "Stonewall" Jackson. Civilians included Clara Barton, Frederick Douglass, Harriet Tubman, Mary Chestnut, and Phoebe Pember.

Note: Several recent issues are not yet available at Wikimedia Commons for use here. For some, place-holders are provided. For previous images readily available for both commemorative and definitive issues, names are linked to their biographical articles in their Civil War career at each stamp description. Links to states take the reader to the "[state] in the American Civil War" series of articles in Wikipedia.

==== Union officers ====
During World War I, Theodore Roosevelt believed it to be a "bully" idea to issue a series of stamps honoring American military heroes. Nothing came of the suggestion until his stamp collecting cousin, Franklin Roosevelt was nearing the end of his first term. His Secretary of War recommended both Union and Confederate generals in the series. Political reaction delayed issue until after election. The opposition was primarily from Northern Republicans against the Confederate choices, and Lost Cause southerners against the Union choices. Today stamp collectors from North and South include both Grant-Sherman-Sheridan and Lee-Jackson stamps in their collections. In the 1990s Civil War series, no state legislature objected to Sherman as a villain as some protested for the 1937 issue. The healing process continued.

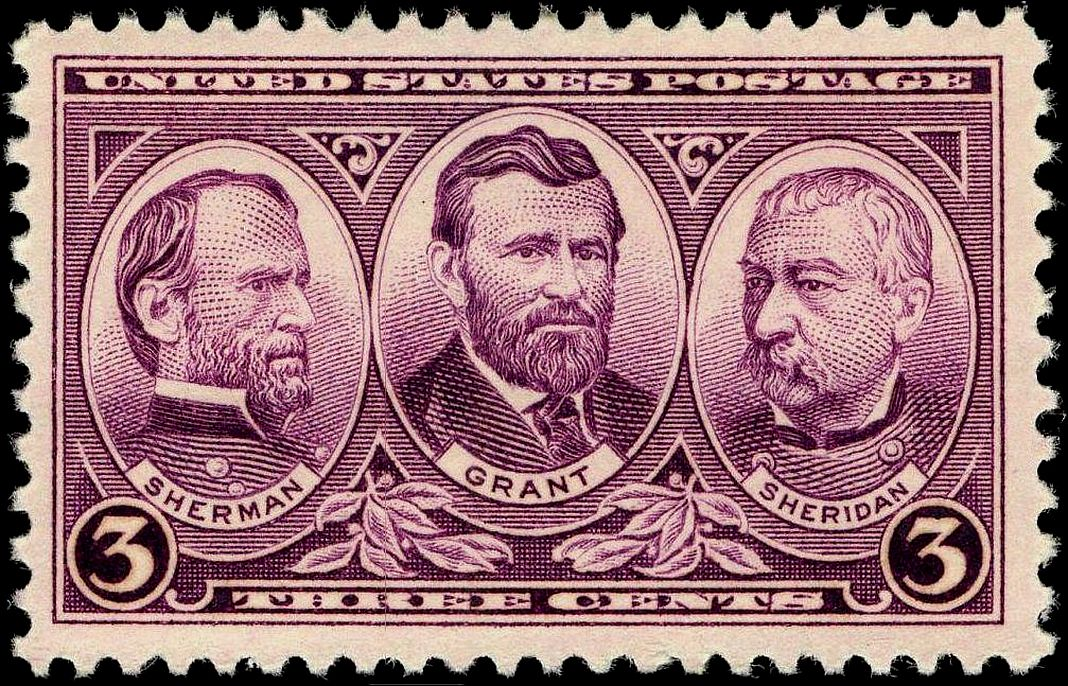
Sherman, Grant, Sheridan

- Ulysses S. Grant was a winning general in the western theater throughout the Mississippi River Valley, promoted to commanding general of the union armies to lead the advance through the Virginia Wilderness, the siege of Richmond to Lee's surrender at Appomattox. His philosophy of war was to "keep the enemy under relentless pressure at all points and to fight whenever opportunity offered." He was subsequently elected to two terms as U.S. President during Congressional Reconstruction.
  - William Tecumseh Sherman gained fame as Grant's lieutenant in the western theater, then launched his March to the Sea through Georgia, turning north through the Carolinas. His determination to attack the spirit of the Southern people was "an entirely novel approach to war making."
  - Philip Sheridan was the Union cavalry commander who finally secured the Valley of Virginia, the breadbasket supplying Richmond and Petersburg throughout their siege. He demonstrated unequalled powers of leadership, "by personal example and vivid inspiration". 1937 issue.

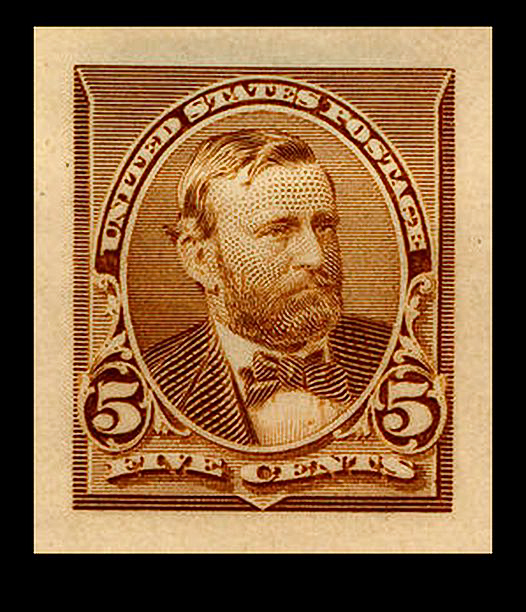
Ulysses S. Grant

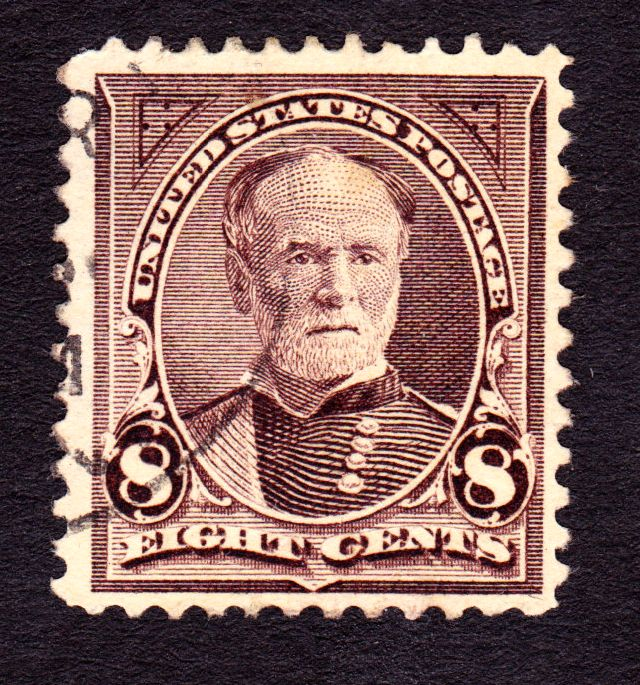
William T. Sherman

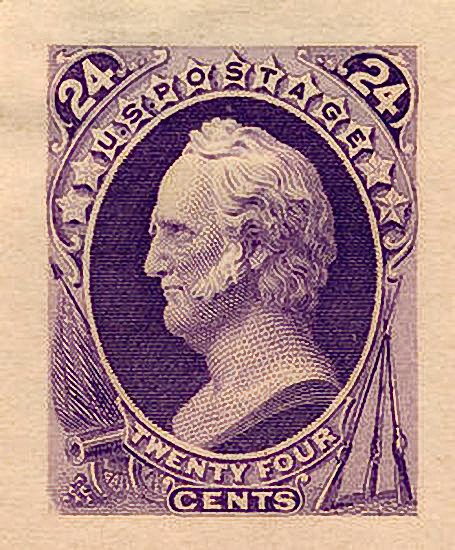
Winfield Scott

- Ulysses S. Grant. 1890 issue.
- William T. Sherman. 1894 issue.
- Winfield Scott, author of the Union's grand-strategic "Anaconda Plan", served as the first U.S. general of the armies in the Civil War. He saw clearly the need to deny Confederated commerce to the outside world, cripple its internal trade, and subject it by penetrating attack. 1870 issue.

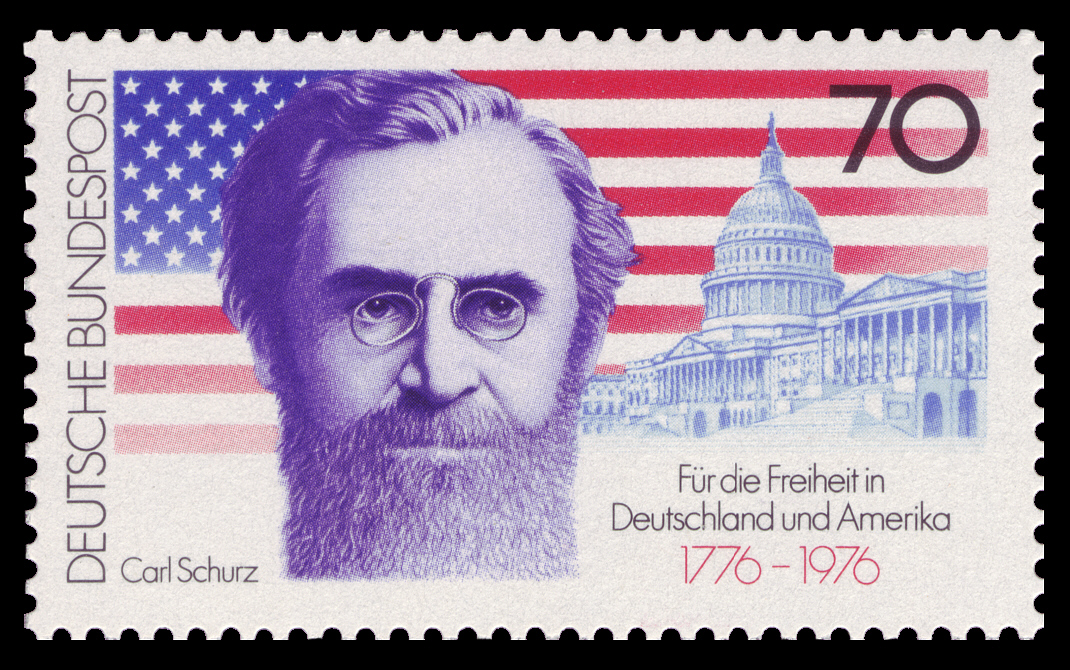
Carl Schurz, "For freedom in Germany and America"

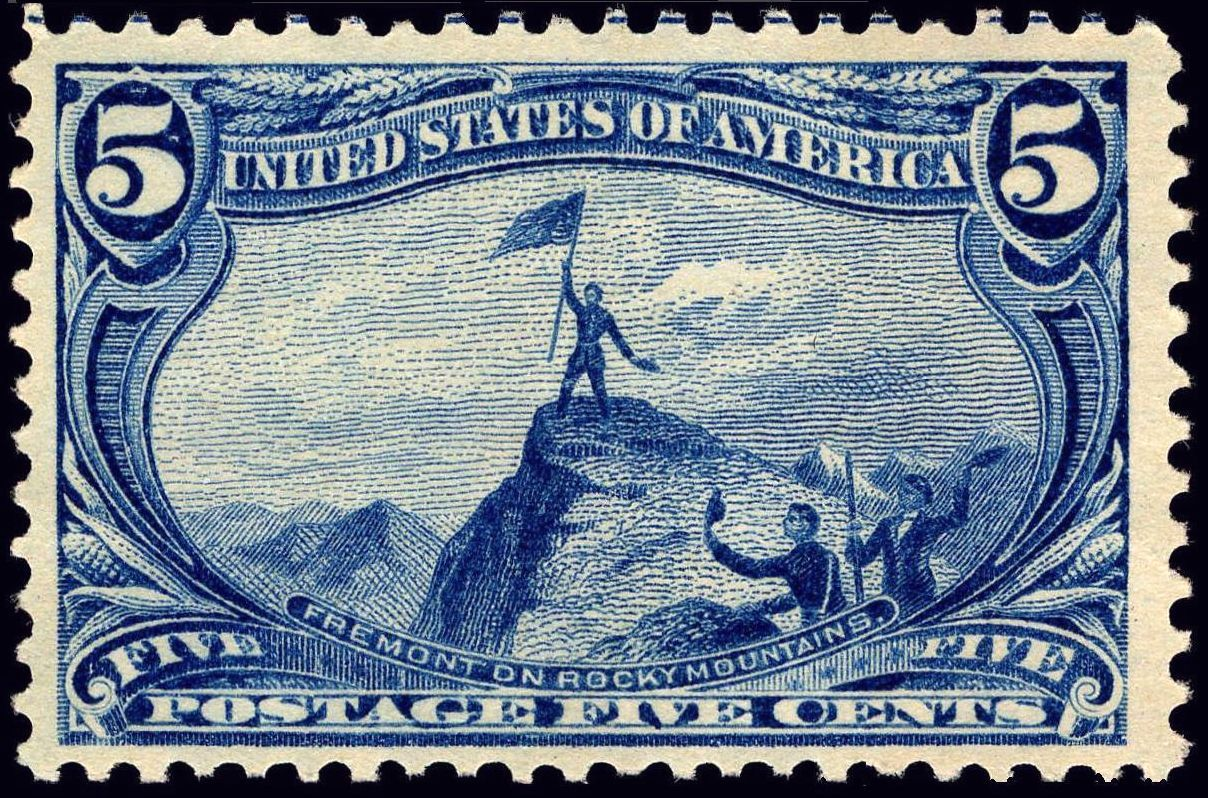
John C. Frémont as "The Pathfinder"

- Carl Schurz, German-American political general, commemorated on a German stamp. An important recruiter of German-American units, subsequently the first German-American elected U.S. Senator. 1976 issue.
- John C. Frémont Republican presidential candidate 1856, political general of the Department of the West, whose edict freeing slaves was countermanded by Lincoln. "He lacked both experience and talent for war." Now principally remembered for his Western explorations. 1898 issue.

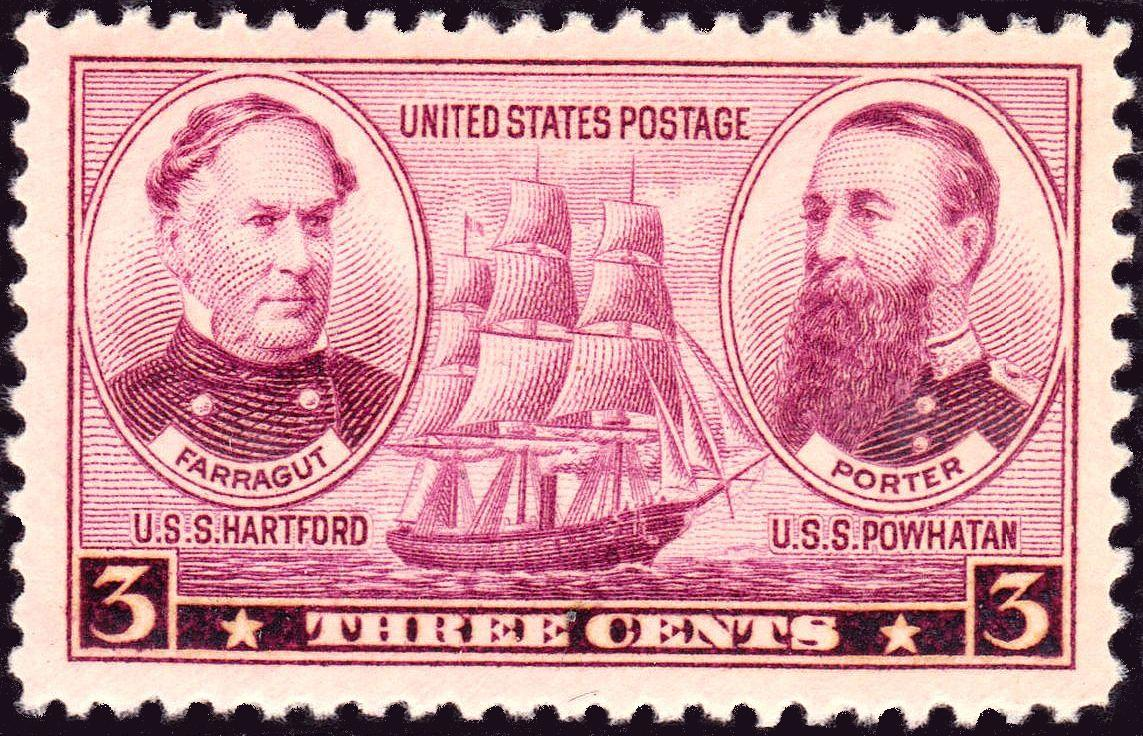
Admirals Farragut and Porter

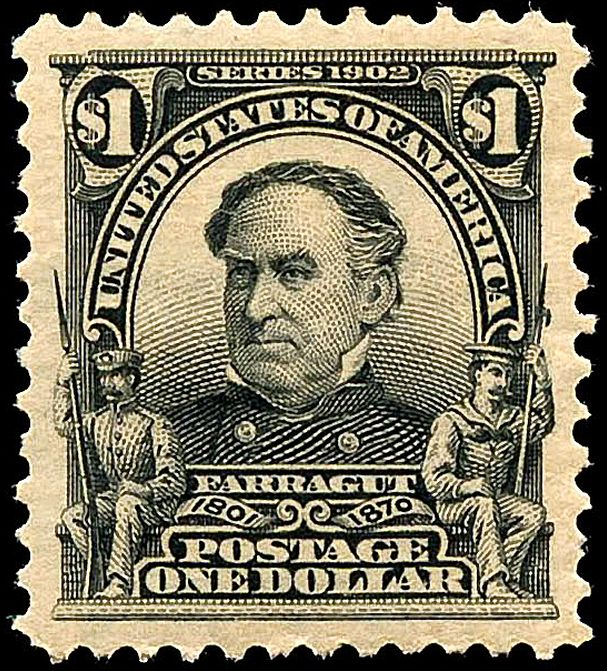
David Farragut, Latino-American

Naval officers Farragut and Porter. 1937 issue.

- David Farragut was instrumental in securing the Andaconda Plan naval blockade at sea including Capture of New Orleans and Battle of Mobile Bay. He orchestrated amphibious operations to secure supply depots and trapping blockade-runners along the Confederate coasts.
- David Dixon Porter was important for his leadership on the rivers of the Mississippi Valley, aggressively supporting river operations and fortress assaults into the South's interior.
- David Farragut 1903 issue.

Winfield Hancock was featured in the Civil War commemorative sheet of 20. Hancock was the hero general of Gettysburg, subsequently Democratic 1880 nominee for president. 1995 issue.

==== Confederate officers ====
The Lee-Jackson stamp of 1937 signified a demonstration of national unity of the New Deal. The Confederate generals were no longer traitors but American war heroes pictured alongside George Washington, William Sherman, and Ulysses S. Grant.

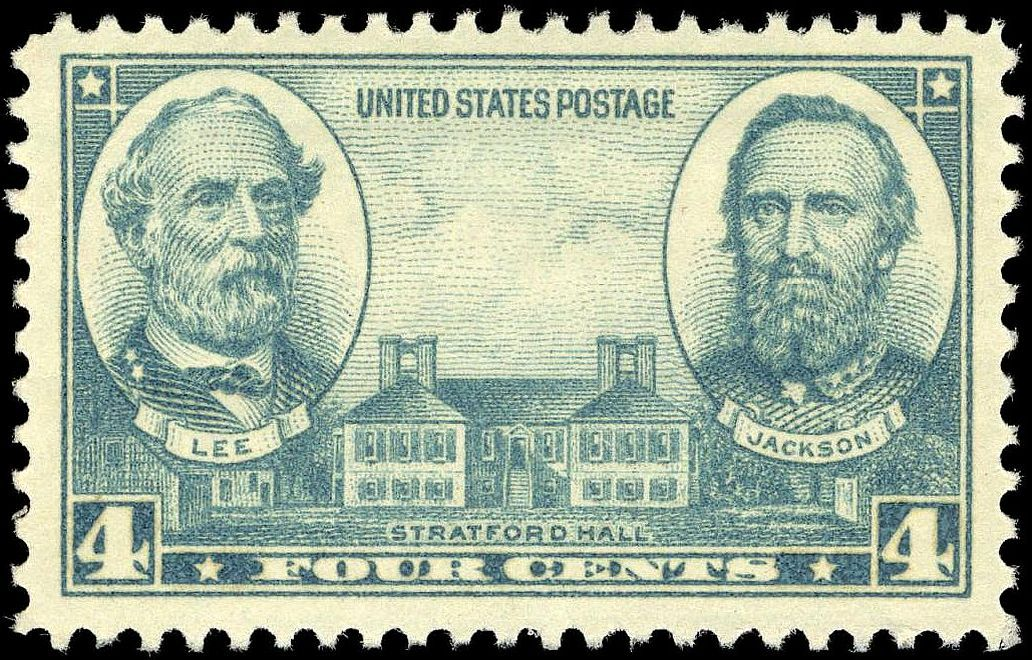
Confederates Lee and Jackson

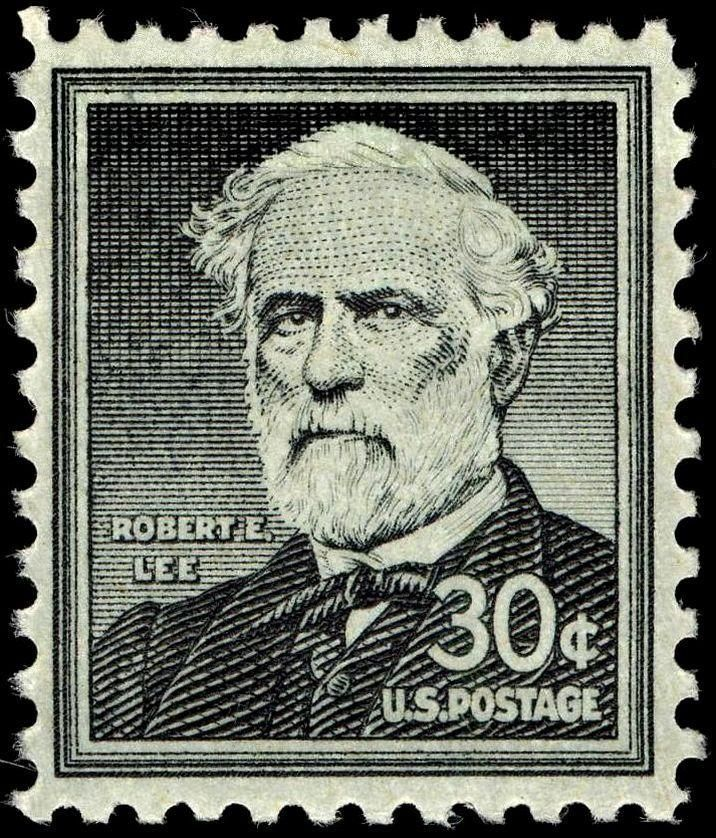
Robert E. Lee, Army of Northern Virginia

- Robert E. Lee commanded the Army of Northern Virginia defending the northern approaches in the Eastern Theater. His decision making was quick and correct in the face of the enemy. A great tactician, he could exploit Union mistakes and economically handle the forces available to him.

Thomas J. Jackson was Lee's most celebrated corps commander, still studied in military academies world over. With an acute topographical sense, capable of striking "savage and unexpected blows", he established psychological superiority by misleading, surprising, and mystifying his opponent.
1937 issue. This commemorative was included in the 1937 Army-Navy series, with five commemorating the U.S. Army and five commemorating the U.S. Navy.

- Robert E. Lee. 1957 issue. The first U. S. definitive stamp devoted to a Confederate notable.

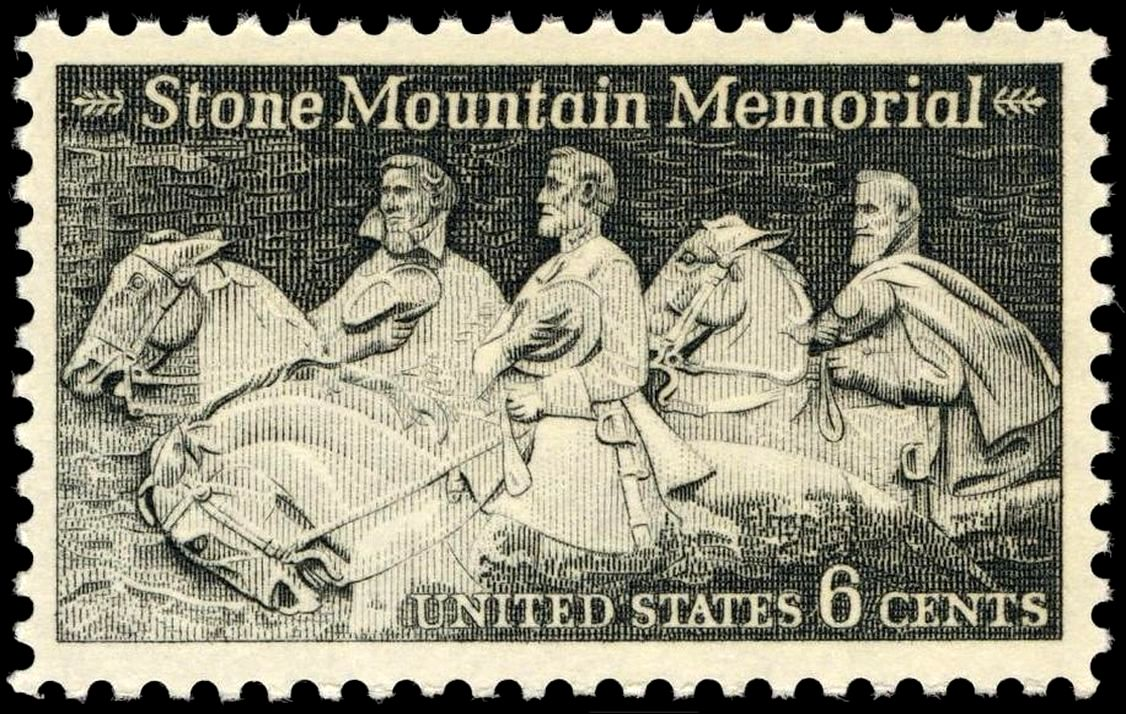
Jefferson Davis, Thomas J. “Stonewall” Jackson and Robert E. Lee

- A six-cent commemorative stamp featuring Jefferson Davis, General Thomas J. “Stonewall” Jackson and Robert E. Lee was issued on September 19, 1970, in conjunction with the dedication of the Stone Mountain Confederate Memorial in Georgia on May 9 that year. It is the largest high relief sculpture in the world, 400 feet above the ground.

Raphael Semmes, was featured in the Civil War commemorative sheet of 20. Semmes was a naval commander of the cruiser CSS Alabama and CSS Sumter raiding U.S. commercial shipping in the Pacific and the Atlantic. 1995 issue.

Stand Watie was featured in the Civil War commemorative sheet of 20. Watie was a Native American general of a Cherokee faction allied with the Confederacy and represented in its Congress. 1995 issue.

Joseph E. Johnston was featured in the Civil War commemorative sheet of 20. Johnston commanded the western armies for the Confederacy. His strategy was the mirror image of Lee's offensive strategies in the Confederate Offensive-defensive strategy, Johnston emphasized the defensive falling back onto Atlanta. 1995 issue.

==== Common soldiers ====
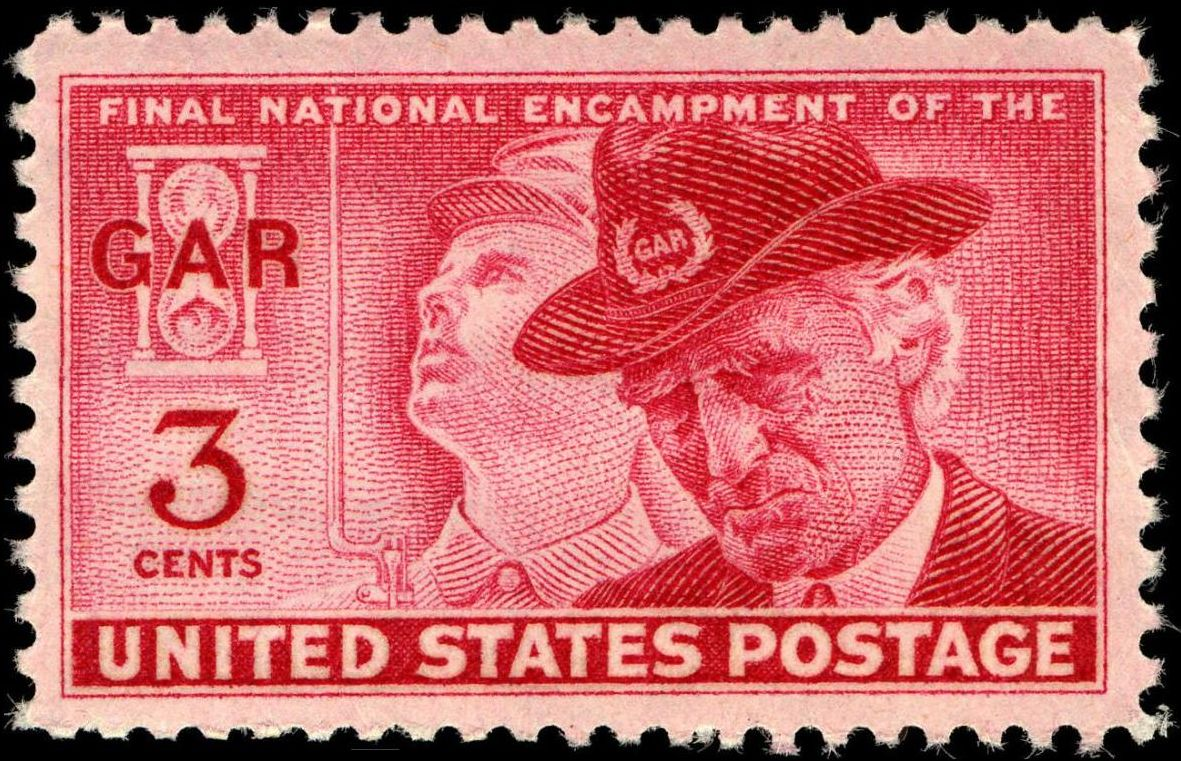
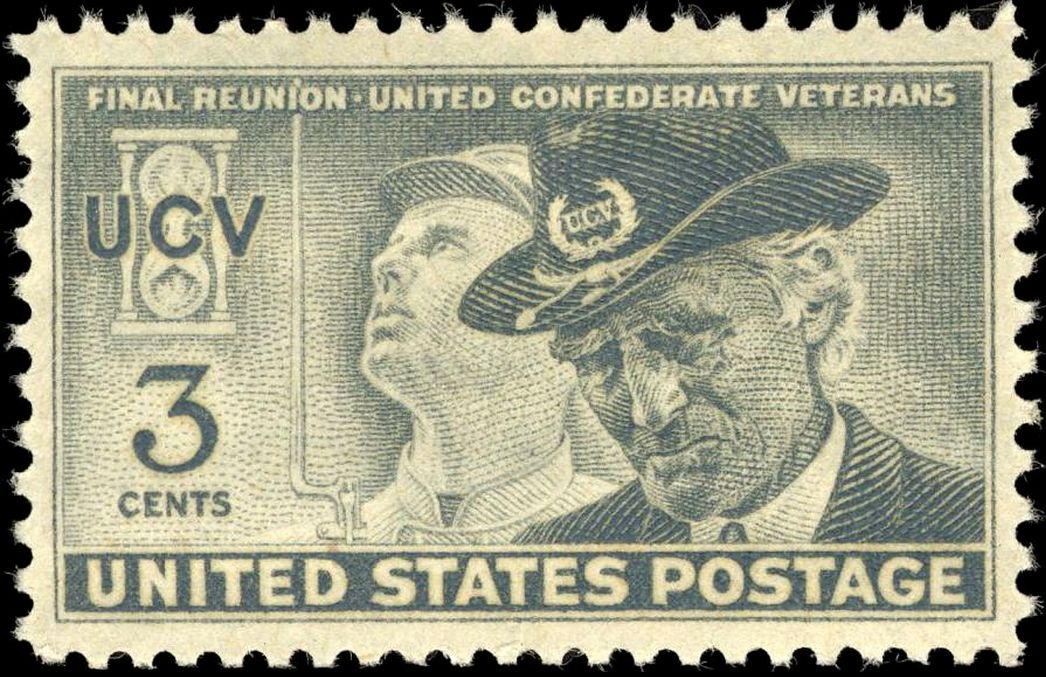
Top: Grand Army of the Republic (Union)
Bottom: United Confederate Veterans

War took its greatest toll on the "Gilded generation" born 1822 to 1842. They were the first American generation to be subject to conscription on both sides. Approximately seven million fought with ten percent dead, one in fifteen from the Union side, one in four in the Confederacy. Over the course of six thousand civil war battles, more died than in all American wars combined, a casualty rate eight times greater than World War II. Nearly half were buried in unmarked graves.
1948 and 1951 saw the issue of two companion stamps commemorating the common soldier of the Civil War.

- The Grand Army of the Republic was the national veterans organization of the Union soldiers and sailors. 1948 issue.
- The United Confederate Veterans was the national veterans organization of the Confederate soldiers and sailors. 1951 issue.

==== Civilians ====
Note: Abraham Lincoln has a section dedicated to him below.

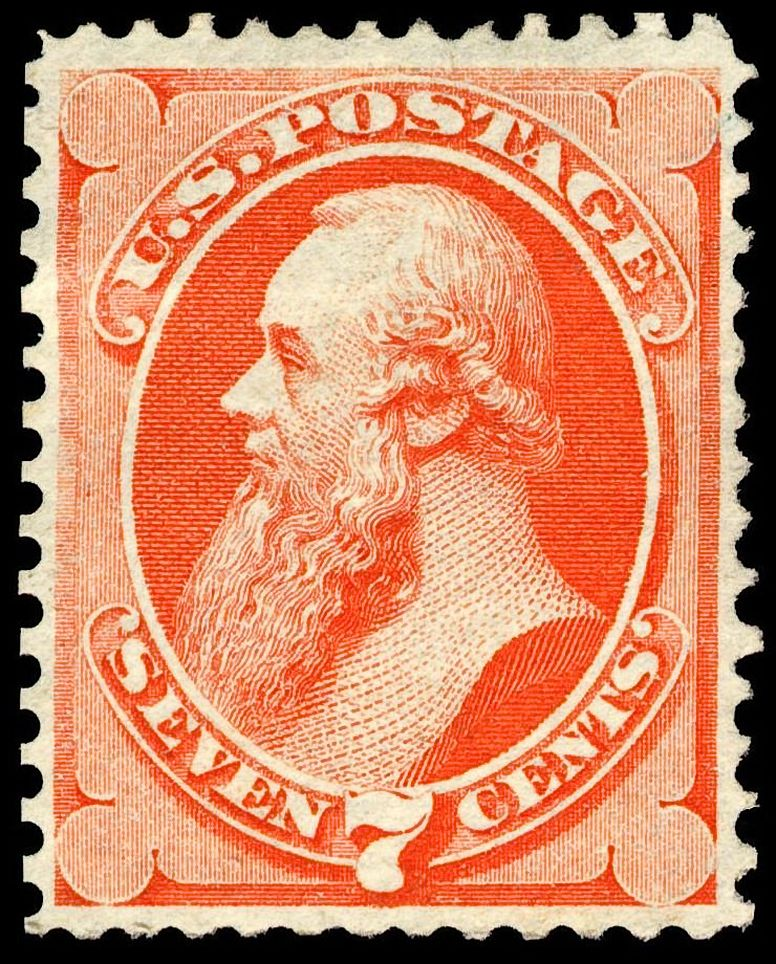
Edwin M. Stanton

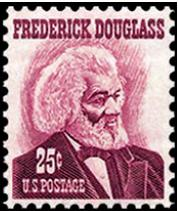
Frederick Douglass

- Edwin M. Stanton, Lincoln's Secretary of War and instrumental in Union success. Subsequently Andrew Johnson's attempt to remove Stanton led to Johnson's impeachment. Moderately anti-slavery, he worked well with congressional committee heads of both parties. He organized an efficient War Department bureaucracy and a system of open competitive bidding for contractors. He instituted the railroad organization and military telegraph. 1871 issue.
- Frederick Douglass was active as a pre-war abolitionist. Publisher of the newspaper North Star. A leading abolitionist in the Civil War, recruited African-Americans into the Union army, including his two sons. Attended 1848 Seneca Falls meeting, a lifelong advocate for woman suffrage. 1967 issue. The first U. S. definitive stamp to honor an African-American.

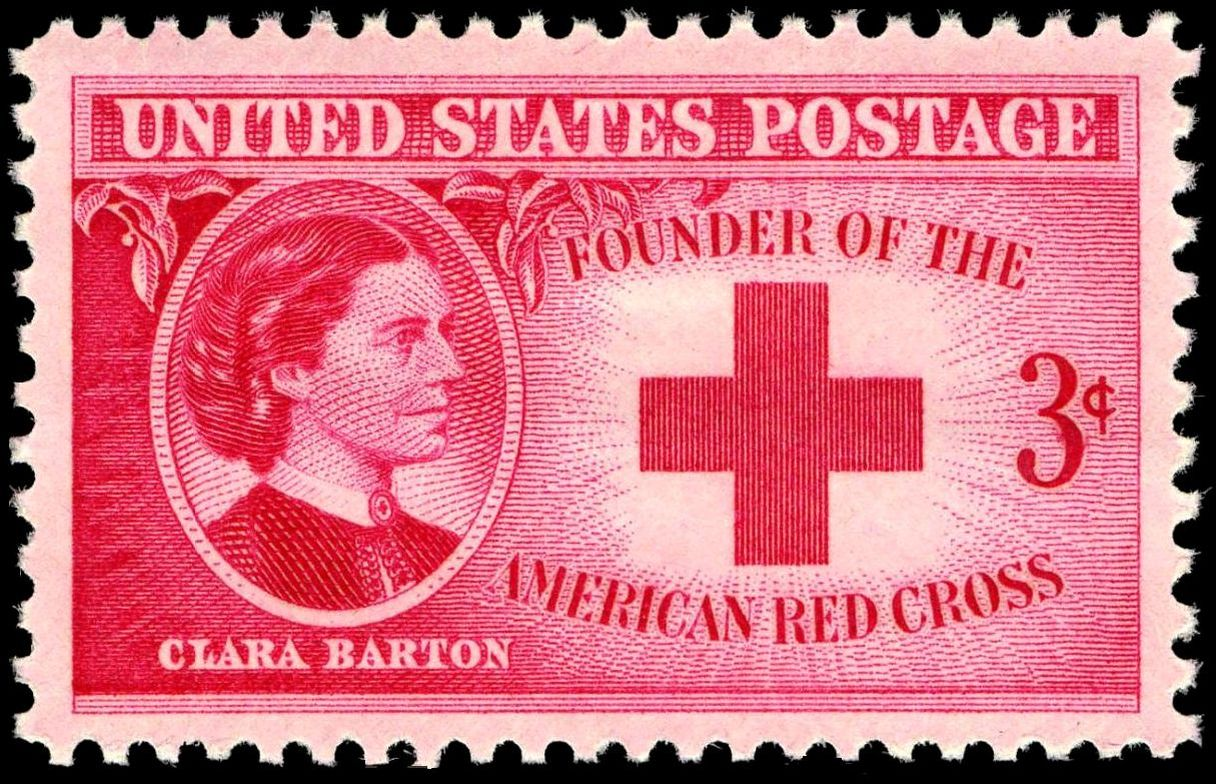
Clara Barton

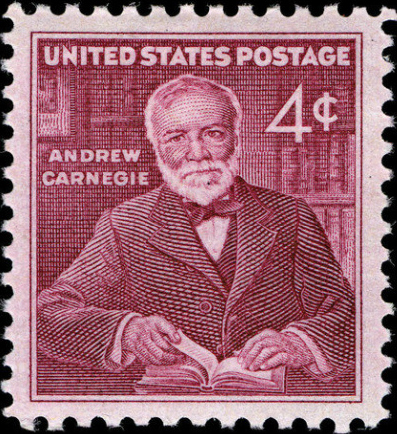
Andrew Carnegie

- Clara Barton, the "Angel of the Battlefield", served as a nurse on the front line at Cedar Run, Second Bull Run, Antietam, and Fredericksburg. In charge of hospitals of the Army of the James in 1864. Subsequently founder of the American Red Cross. 1940 issue.
- Andrew Carnegie was Superintendent of the Military Railways and the Union Government's telegraph lines in the East. Subsequently the U.S. Steel Corporation magnate. He suffered sunstroke assisting Union wounded after First Bull Run. 1960 issue.
- Sojourner Truth was featured as a human rights activist in the Black Heritage Series. During the Civil War she recruited black troops for the Union Army; her grandson enlisted in the 54th Massachusetts. In 1864, she worked for the National Freedman's Relief Association in Washington DC. 1986 issue.
- Harriet Tubman was featured in the Civil War commemorative sheet of 20. Tubman, "Moses", was a conductor on the Underground Railroad, recruited for John Brown, and served as a Union spy. 1995 issue.
- Mary Chesnut was featured in the Civil War commemorative sheet of 20. Chesnut was a Confederate diarist, married to James, a U.S. Senator, signer of the Confederate Constitution and army general. Chestnut criticized both slavery and "Yankee interference", "Think of all these young lives sacrificed!" 1995 issue.
- Phoebe Pember was featured in the Civil War commemorative sheet of 20. Pember served as a nurse and Confederate hospital administrator for 15,000 patients in Richmond. Hancock 1995 issue.

=== Events in the Civil War ===
==== Battles ====
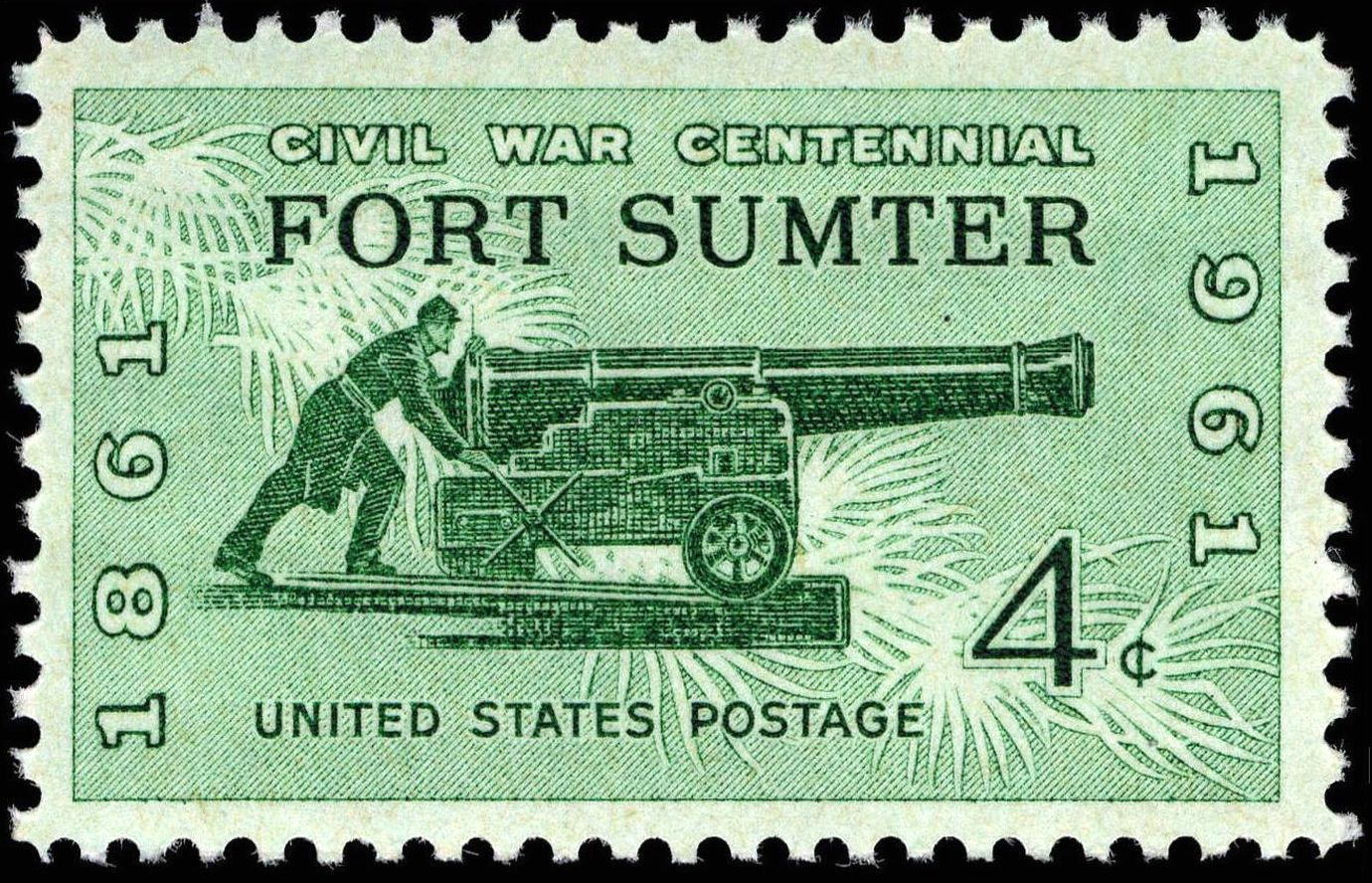
Battle of Fort Sumter 1861

- Fort Sumter is considered the first battle of the American Civil War. Confederate firing on the Union flag led to Lincoln's call up of volunteers to restore U.S. possession of its forts and property throughout the South. 1961 issue.
- First Bull Run (First Manassas). The Bull Run stamp commemorates the first major battle near Manassas, Virginia. It reproduces a 1964 painting by Sidney E. King, “The Capture of Rickett's Battery,” showing the fighting on Henry Hill over an important Union battery. The Union troops are shown fleeing their position in a rout back to Washington DC. Union advance onto Richmond was repelled with losses larger than any in the Mexican War, steeling both sides for a long conflict. Tellingly, Confederates could not follow up on their victory and the Union did not withdraw from its occupation. 2011 issue.

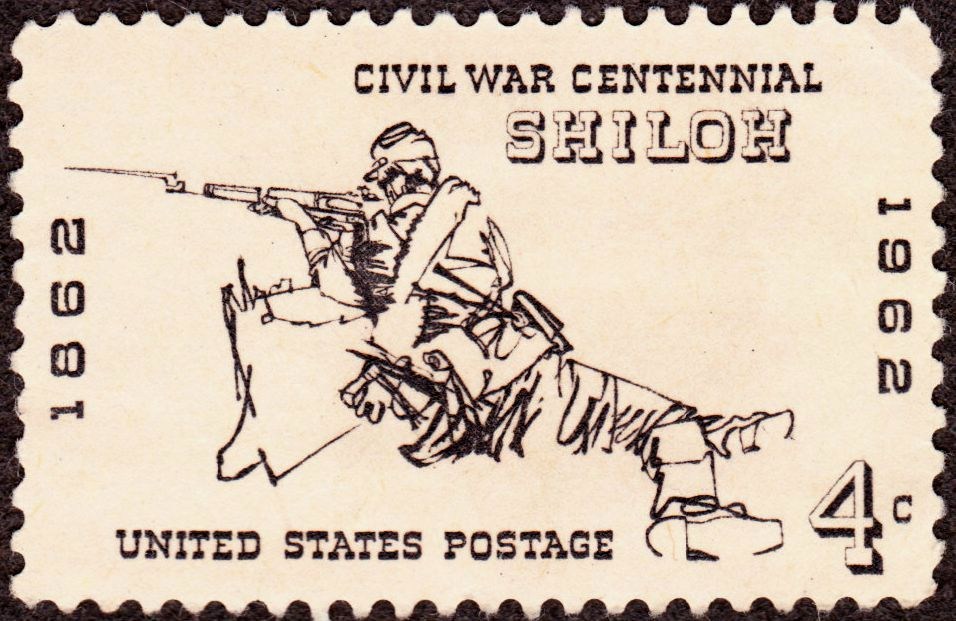
Battle of Shiloh 1862

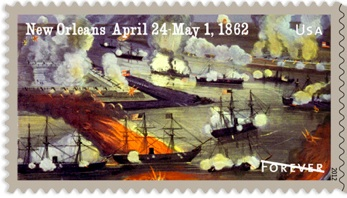
Capture of New Orleans 1862

- The Battle of Shiloh secured the Union advance up the Tennessee River and secured Grant's reputation in the Western Theater. 1962 issue.
- New Orleans capture was an important Union naval victory over Confederate ironclad and gunboats. It placed the Confederacy’s most vital port in Union hand, impacting affecting trade, finance, and shipbuilding. The stamp reproduces an 1862 colored lithograph by Currier & Ives titled “The Splendid Naval Triumph on the Mississippi, April 24th, 1862.” The port was a Union military staging area, terminal on the Underground Railroad, and the important food growing region supported Union armies. It was excluded from the Emancipation Proclamation. 2012 issue.

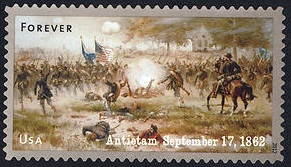
Battle of Antietam 1862

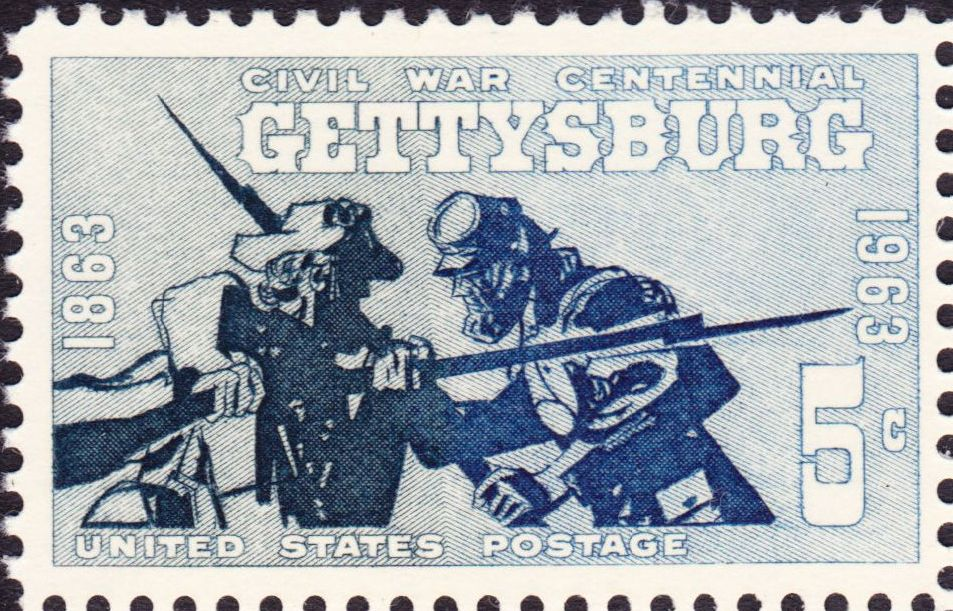
Battle of Gettysburg 1863

- The Battle of Antietam in 1862 was one of the most important military operations of the entire Civil War. The reversal of Confederate fortunes gave a tremendous boost to Northern morale and forestalled foreign recognition of the Confederate states. The stamp reproduces an 1887 painting by Thure de Thulstrup, one of a series of popular prints commissioned in the 1880s by Boston publisher Louis Prang & Co. to commemorate the Civil War. Antietam was the Union victory signaling Lincoln's preliminary Emancipation Proclamation announcing freedom to the slaves in areas of rebellion. It saw the largest number of casualties for a single-day's battle. 2012 issue.
- Battle of Gettysburg is considered the military turning point of the Civil War. It resulted in the largest number of casualties over three days' fighting. Turning back Lee's invasion of the North spelled the end of Confederate hopes for international recognition. 1963 issue.

Battle of Vicksburg 1863

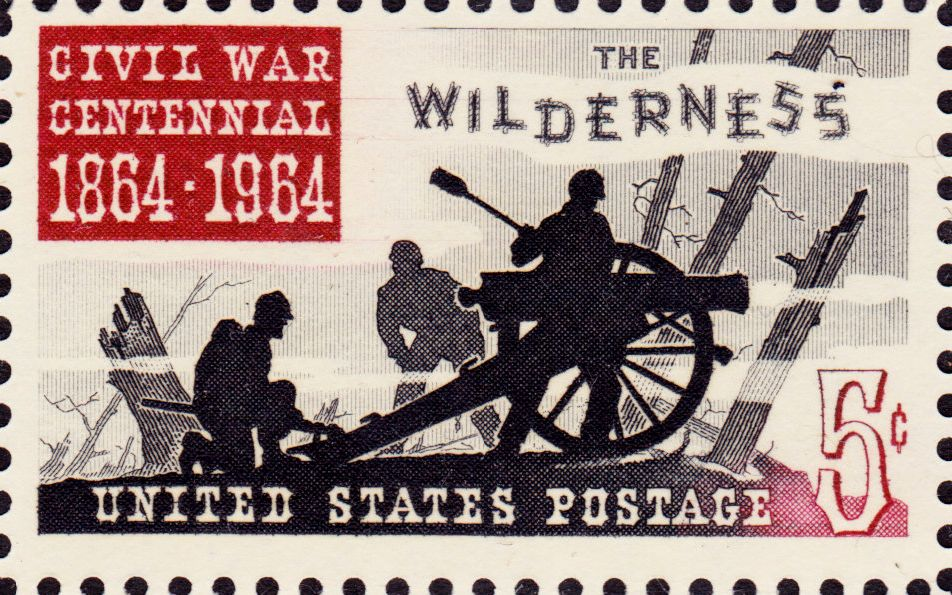
Battle of the Wilderness 1864

- Battle of Vicksburg opened the Mississippi to unrestricted Union war supply and commerce, "The father of waters flow's unvexed to the sea."—Lincoln. It was the climax of the longest and most complex military campaign of the Civil War. Vicksburg was a major port city on the Mississippi River preventing the Union’s control over the entire river, “the key” to bringing the war to an end. In “the greatest amphibious operation in American history up to that time,” Grant encircled Vicksburg. The assault began on May 19 and after a siege, the city surrendered on July 4, one day after the Union victory at Gettysburg. The Battle of Vicksburg stamp is a reproduction of an 1863 lithograph by Currier & Ives titled “Admiral Porter’s Fleet Running the Rebel Blockade of the Mississippi at Vicksburg, April 16th, 1863.” 2013 issue.
- Battle of the Wilderness was a series of battles over weeks as Grant faced down the once invincible Army of Northern Virginia and circled south towards Richmond. The campaign turned into a war of attrition that led to Grant's critics to call him a butcher. 1964 issue.

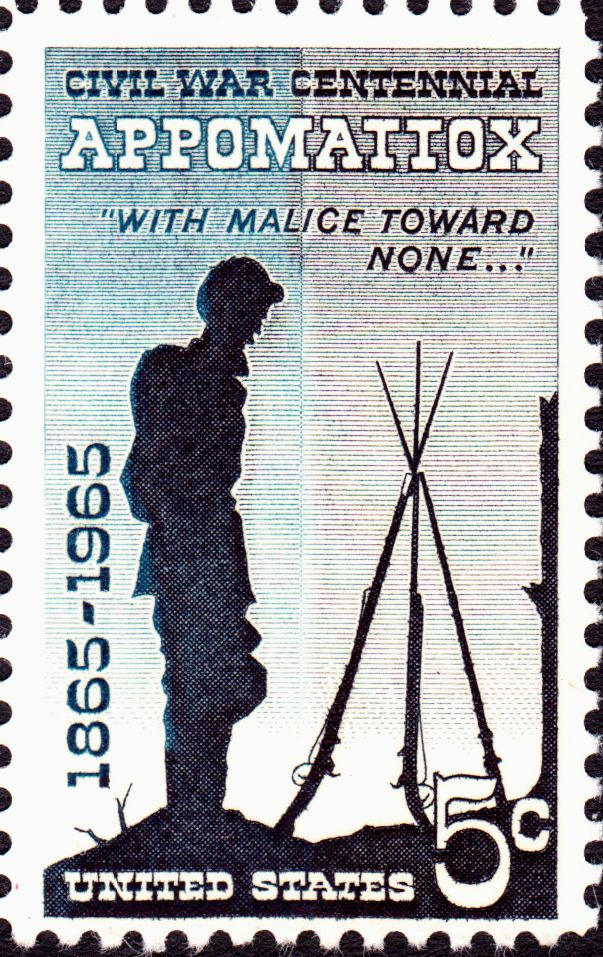
Appomattox surrender

Appomattox surrender followed Confederate evacuation of Petersburg and Richmond. Lee's remnant army was surrounded without supply of food or ammunition. Terms were generous, contributing to the nation's healing following civil war. 1965 issue.

The Battle of Hampton Roads between the Monitor and Merrimac (Virginia), Battle of Shiloh, Battle of Chancellorsville and Battle of Gettysburg were featured in the Civil War commemorative sheet of 20. 1995 issue.

==== Reconstruction ====
Modern historians date Reconstruction from 1863 to 1877. This period witnessed national efforts to integrate the former slaves into American society through the "Civil War" or Reconstruction Amendments, as freedmen in the Thirteenth Amendment, as citizens in every state in the Fourteenth Amendment, and as voters in the Fifteenth Amendment. The Thirteenth Amendment was sent to the states before Lincoln's assassination, the Fourteenth passed over Johnson's active opposition, the Fifteenth passed during Grant's administration.

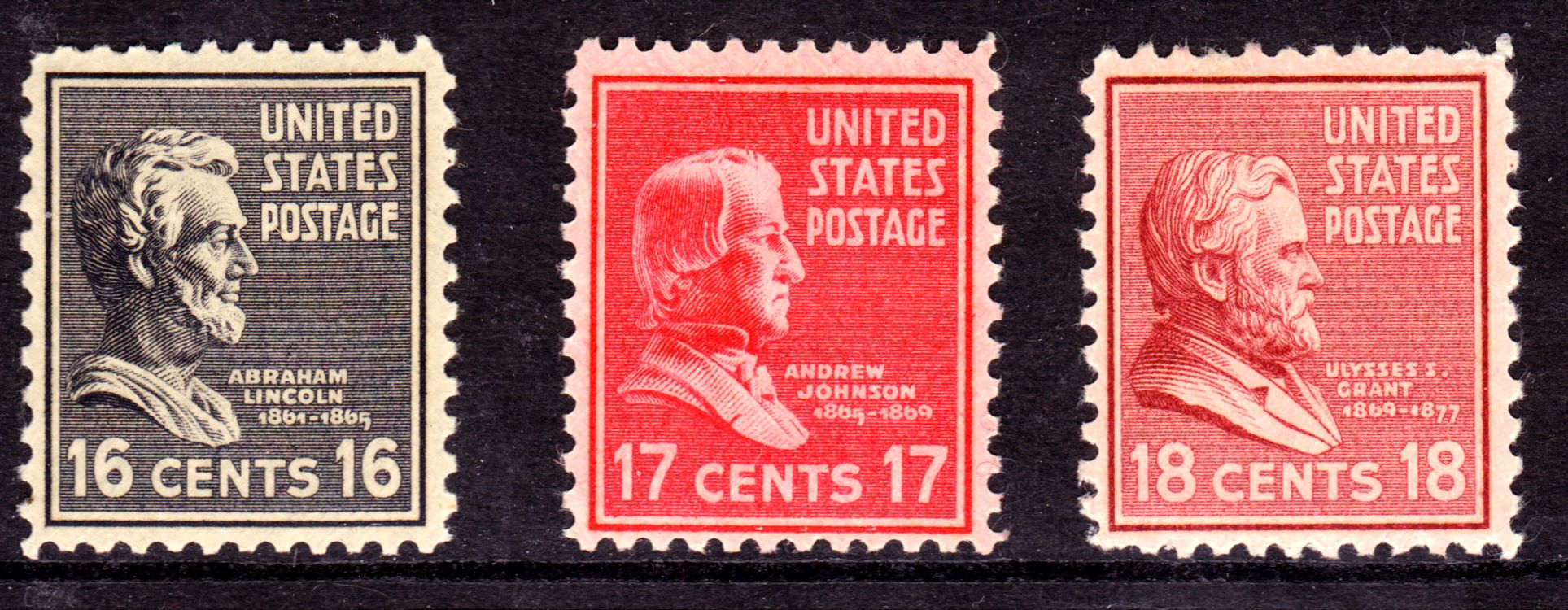
Lincoln, Johnson, Grant

- Lincoln oversaw reconstruction in those states and places that were not included in the Emancipation Proclamation, Tennessee, parts of Louisiana, Virginia.
- Johnson's program of "Presidential Reconstruction" did not last to 1868. He was impeached, although not removed from office.
- Grant served two consecutive terms administering "Congressional Reconstruction". 1938 issue.

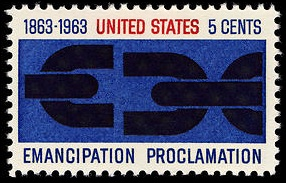
Emancipation Proclamation 1863

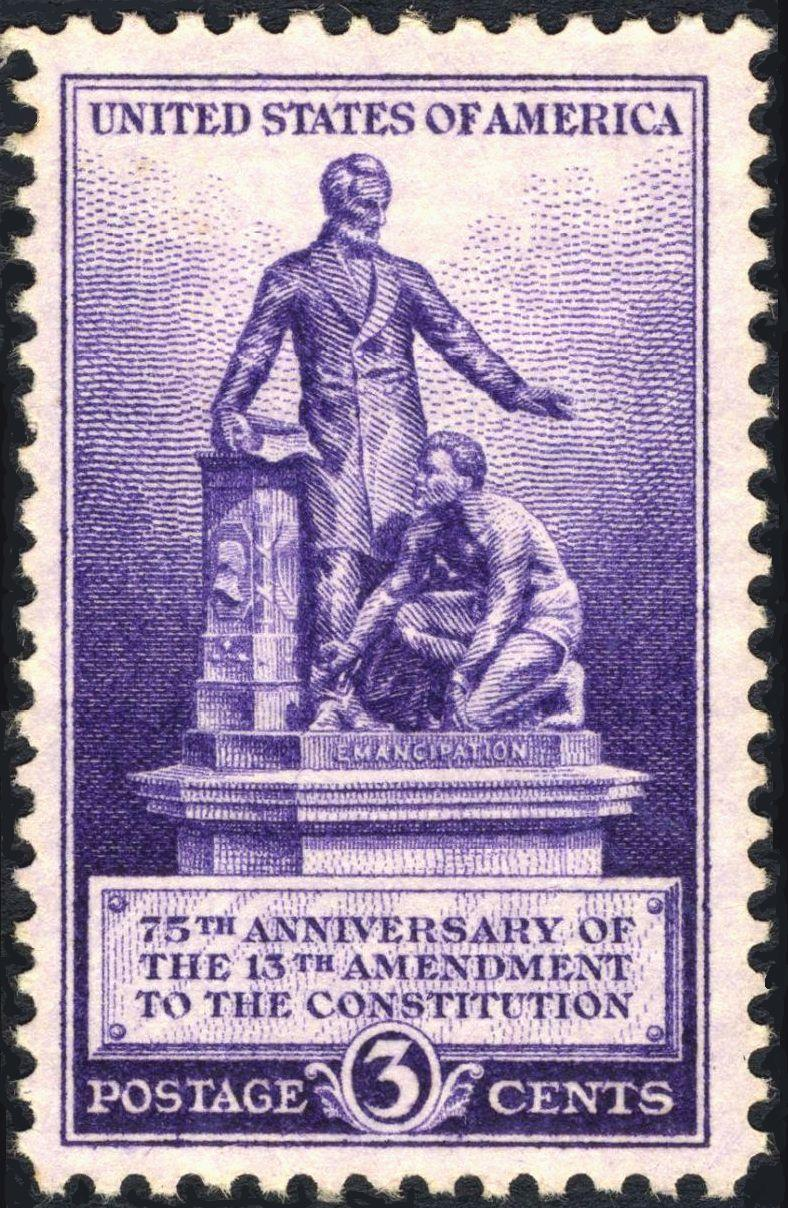
Thirteenth Amendment 1865

- The Emancipation Proclamation by Lincoln freed all slaves in territory under rebellion. It was commemorated on its 100th anniversary with a 5-cent stamp placed on sale at Chicago, Illinois, on August 16, 1963, the opening day of the Century of Negro Progress Exhibition there. It was designed by Georg Olden and printed on the Giori press, issued in panes of fifty with an initial printing of 120 million stamps.
- The Thirteenth Amendment to the U.S. Constitution was commemorated by a 3-cent stamp on the 75th anniversary on October 20, 1940. The amendment abolished slavery in the United States. The bronze sculpture by Thomas Ball in Lincoln Park, DC was funded by voluntary subscriptions from emancipated slaves, depicting Lincoln presenting the Emancipation Proclamation to a black man.

==== Culture ====
In literature the onset of the Civil War occasioned important considerations of nationalism, citizenship and the nature of the American republic.

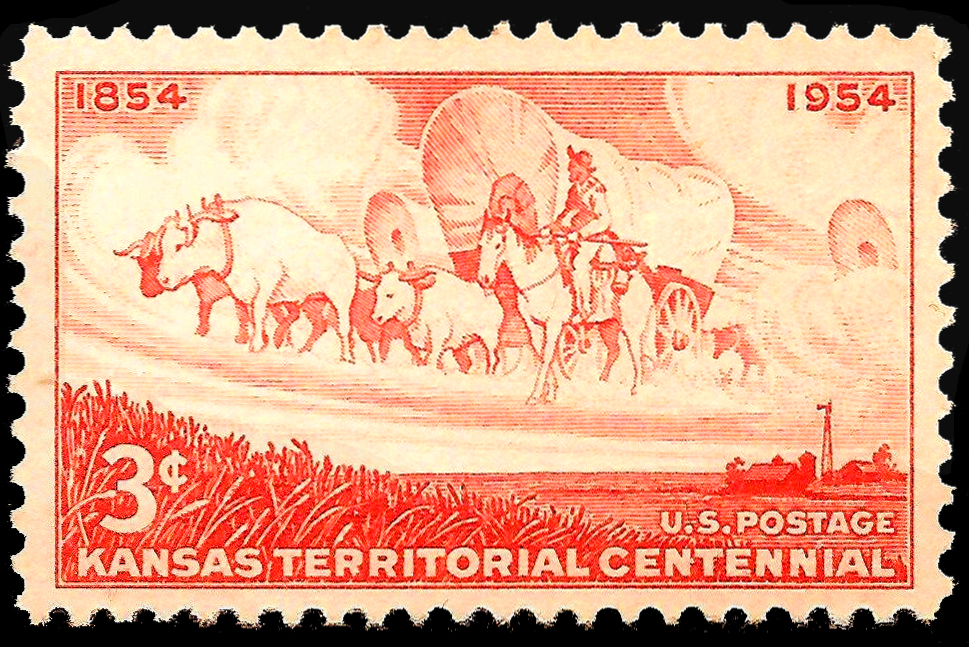
Kansas territorial centennial 1954

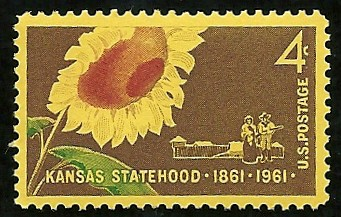
Kansas statehood, January 29, 1861

- Kansas Territory had applied for statehood as a slave state by a constitutional procedure wracked by violence and corruption, Bleeding Kansas. The House of Representatives voted down President Buchanan's proposal for a slave-state. 1954 issue.
- Kansas was admitted to the Union as a free-soil state amidst states declaring secession and before Confederates fired the first shot on Fort Sumter. Kansas was said to be a cause for Virginia's secession. 1961 issue.

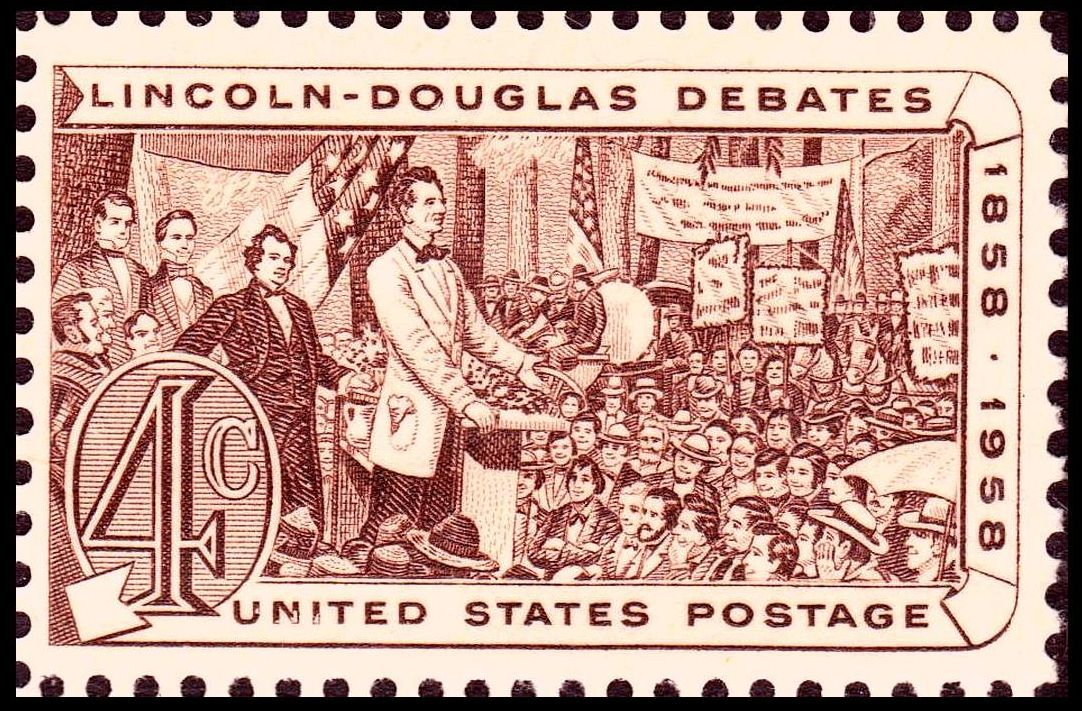
Lincoln-Douglas debates

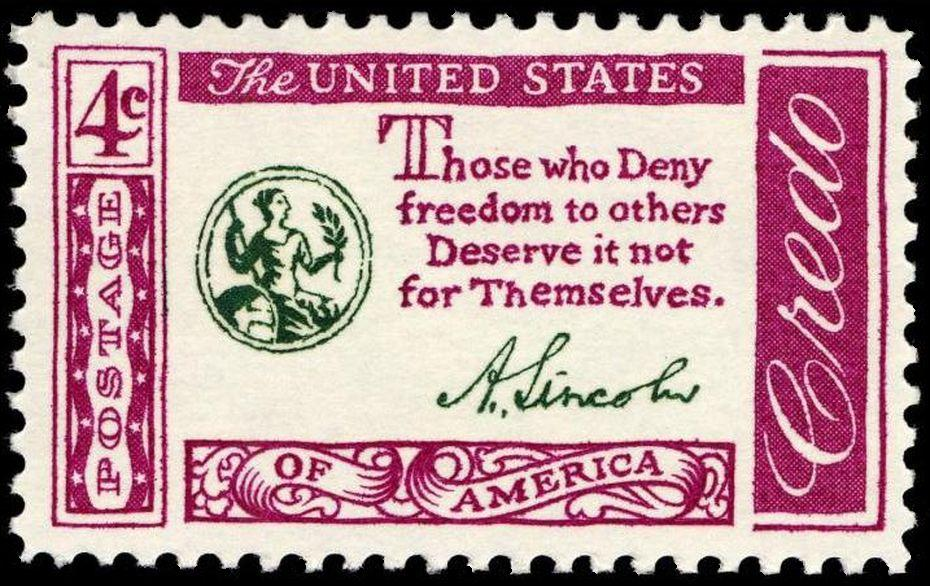
"Those who deny freedom to others deserve it not for themselves."

- Lincoln-Douglas debates were republished widely as literature for Lincoln's presidential campaign. In Douglas' "Norfolk Doctrine" during his campaign swing through the South he promised resistance to secession by force. In the event, Douglas raised troops for "Lincoln's army" throughout Illinois following the firing on Fort Sumter. 1958 issue.
- American Credo quote from letter to H.L. Pierce, April 6, 1859. 1960 issue. Many of Lincoln's letters were meant for publication and found their way into the press.

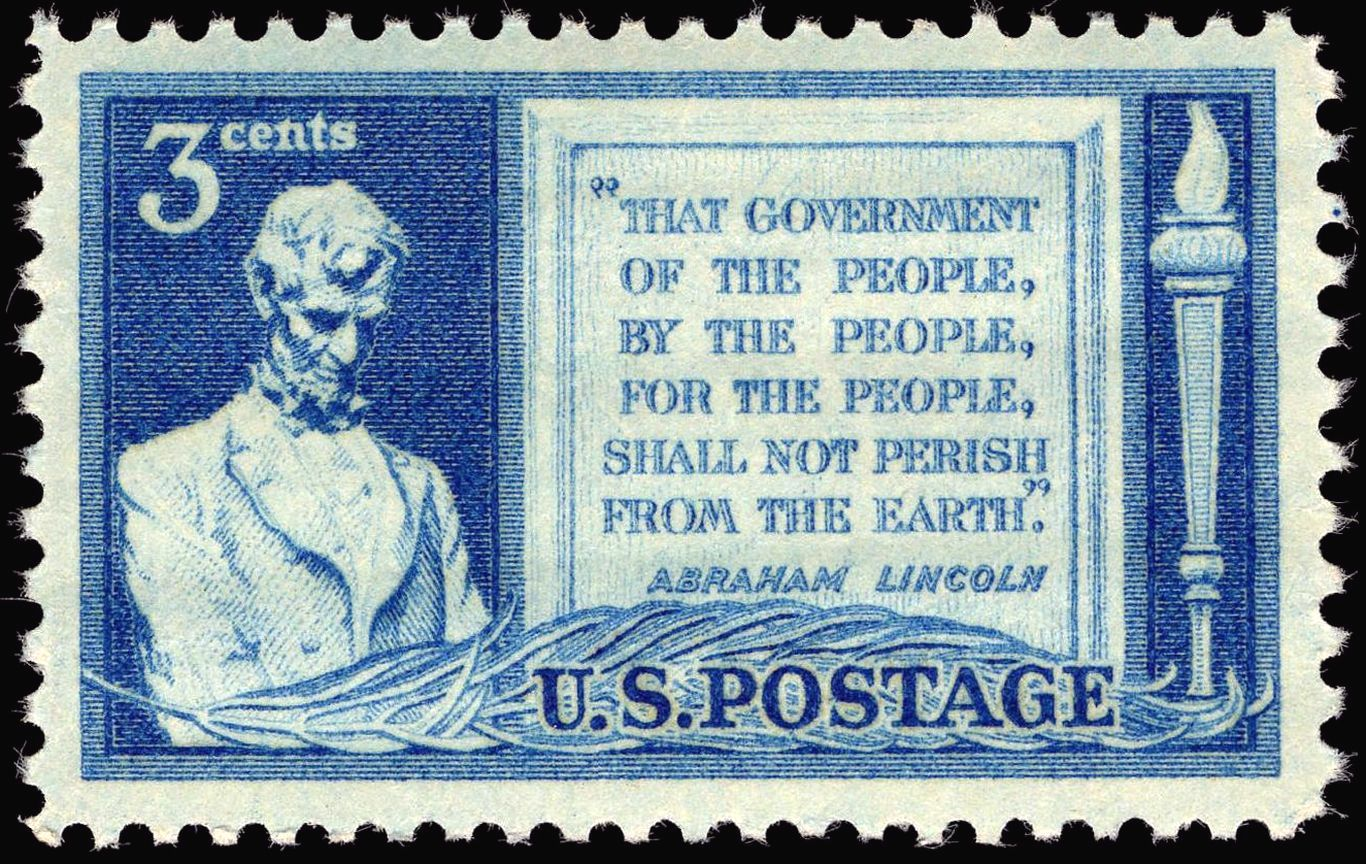
Gettysburg Address

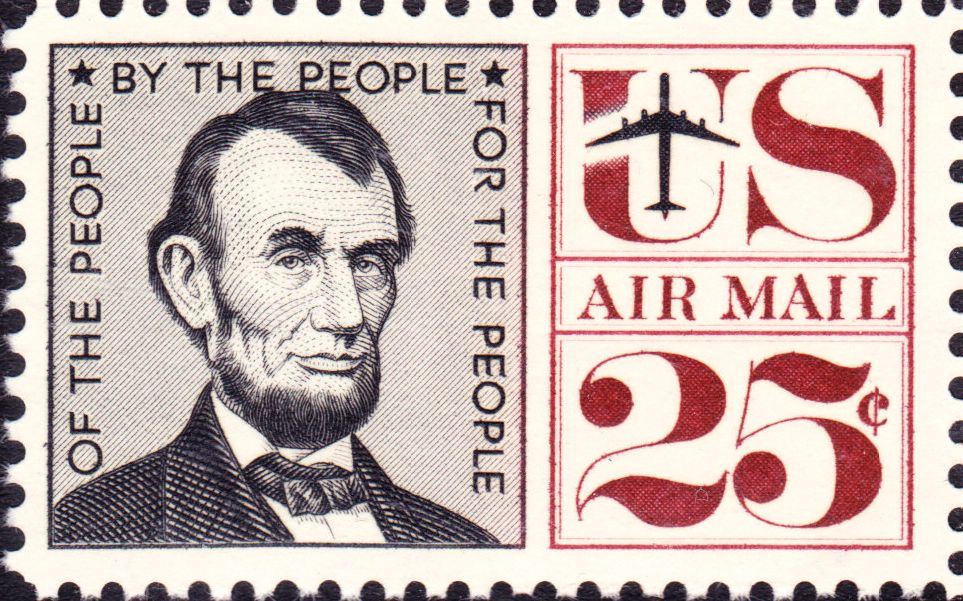
"Of the people, by the people, for the people"

- Gettysburg Address helped redefine two war goals of the Union in the Civil War and the nature of U.S. nationalism. It is considered one of the masterpieces of English literature, and generally follows the form of Pericles' Oration. 1948 Issue.
- Lincoln and Gettysburg Address quote, "of the people, by the people, for the people." Lincoln is the only president pictured on an airmail stamp. 1960 issue.

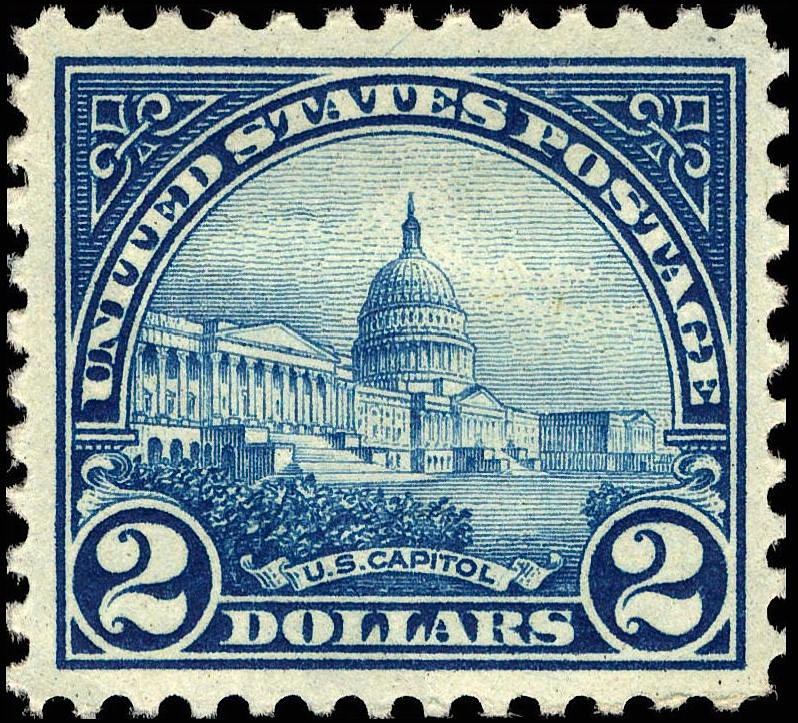
U.S. Capitol

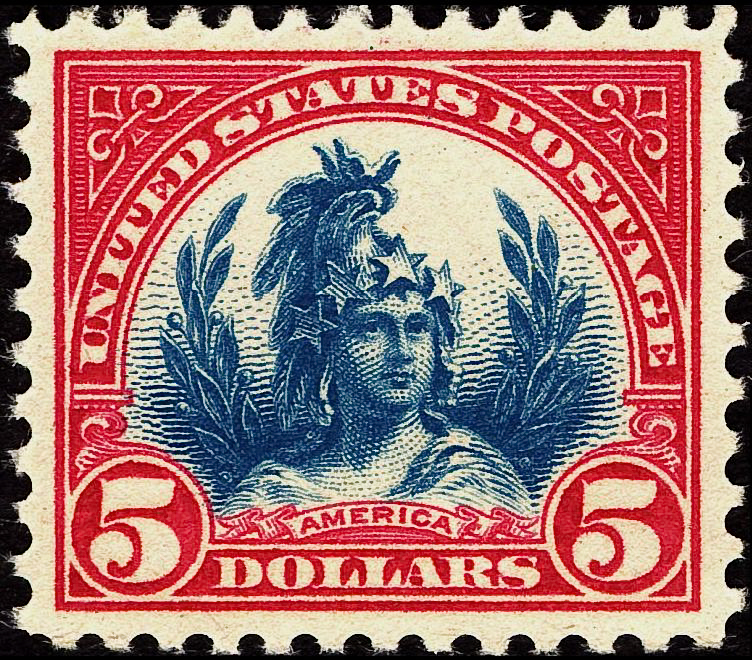
Freedom Triumphant
in War and Peace

- The United States Capitol dome may be the most famous American man-made landmark, symbolizing the united republic under the originally named statue "Freedom Triumphant in War and Peace". The Dome was designed by architect Thomas U. Walter, and Montgomery C. Meigs, a captain in the Army Corps of Engineers, was the principal superintendent of construction until the onset of war. The last section of the Statue of Freedom was put in place on top of the dome December 2, 1863 by William B. Franklin as engineer in charge, amid celebration and military salutes. 1922 issue.
- Freedom Triumphant in War and Peace atop the U.S. Capitol dome. December 2, 1863 following the July victories of Gettysburg and Vicksburg. Bronze by sculptor Thomas Crawford. The final design was approved by then U.S. Secretary of War Jefferson Davis in April 1856. 1923 issue.

Radical social changes involving communications, women's rights, civil rights, states' rights and other issues had already been set in motion before the Civil War, and accelerated through it into succeeding historical eras.

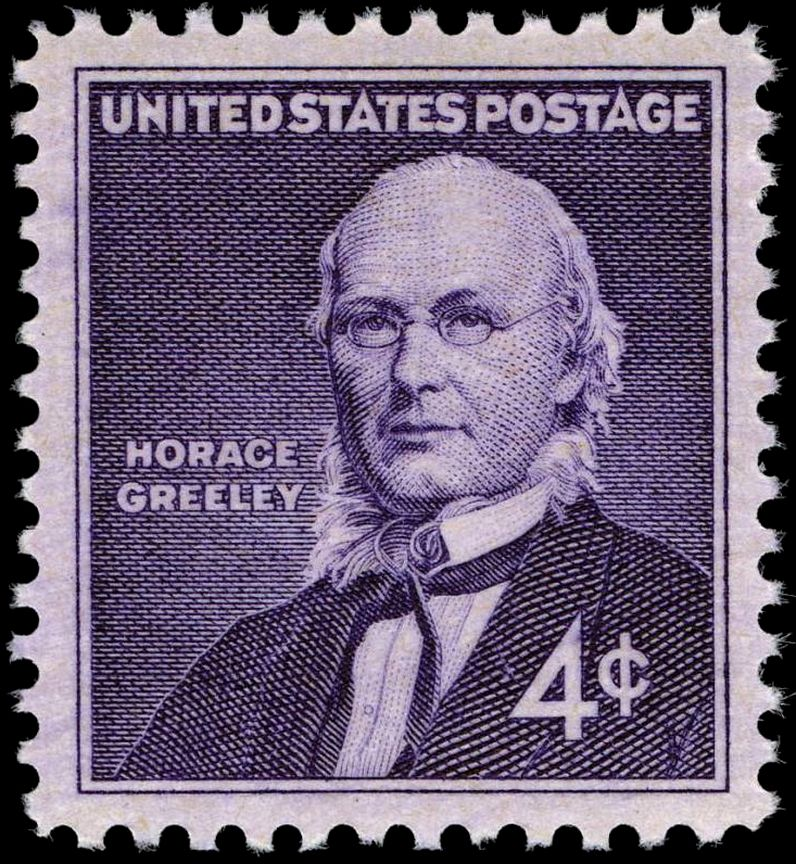
Horace Greeley

- Horace Greeley, editor of the New York Tribune, a daily Republican newspaper. By 1860 it was the leading newspaper in the country outside the South, where it was banned. Greeley reluctantly endorsed Lincoln, advocated for the Homestead Act and promoted vegetarianism. He vacillated in his support of the war effort. Following hostilities he sought amnesty for rebels and contributed to the bond posted to release Jefferson Davis from jail. 1961 issue.

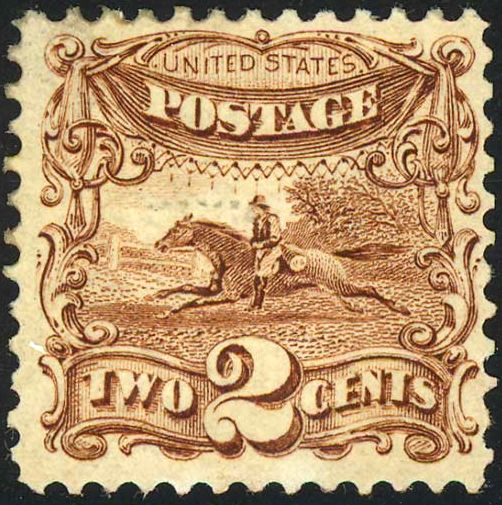
Pony Express 1869

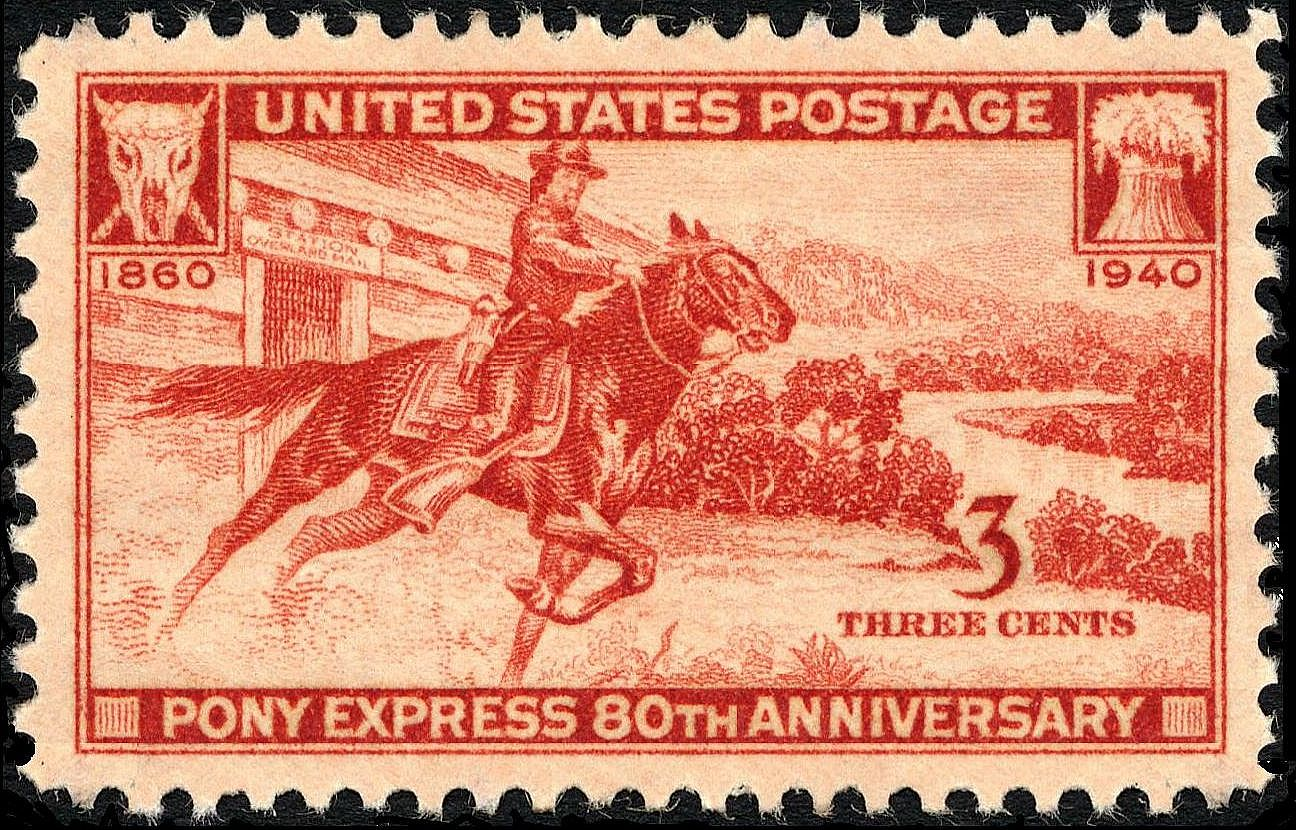
Pony Express 1940

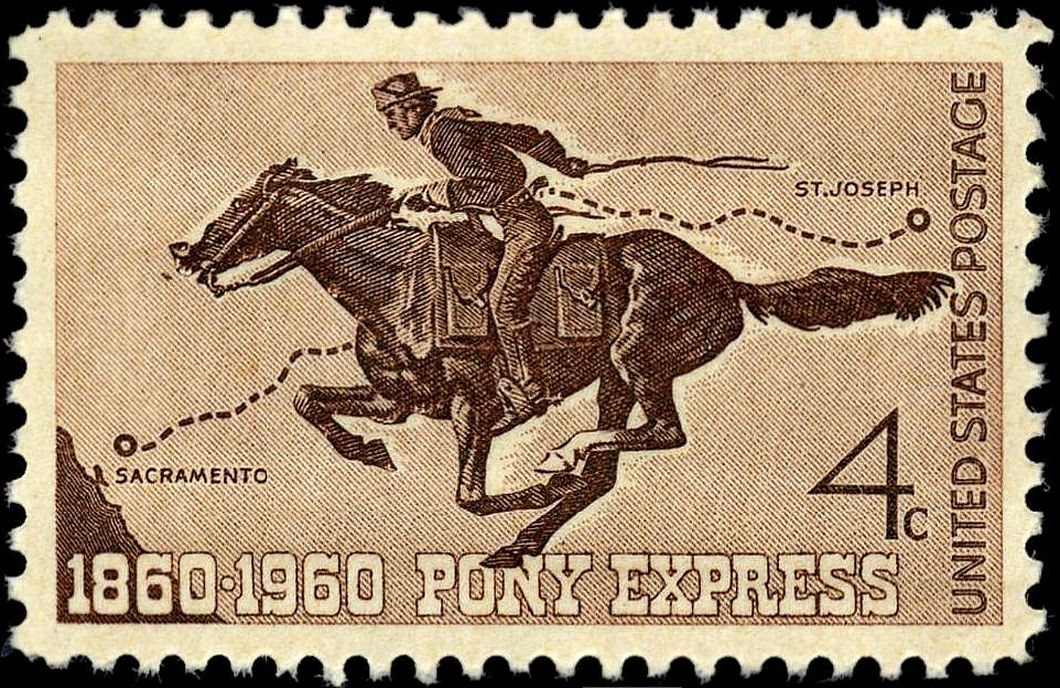
Pony Express 1960

- The Pony Express linked east and west, St. Joseph MO to Sacramento CA during the Civil War. By November 1860, Pony Express riders linked Fort Kearny, Nebraska Territory at the end of the eastern telegraph line with Fort Churchill, Nevada Territory at the end of the western telegraph line. The Pony Express was completely replaced by telegraph lines October 1861 and ended operation. Stagecoach took up regular mail service. 1869, 1940, 1960 issues.

Elizabeth Cady Stanton, Carrie Chapman Catt, Lucretia Mott

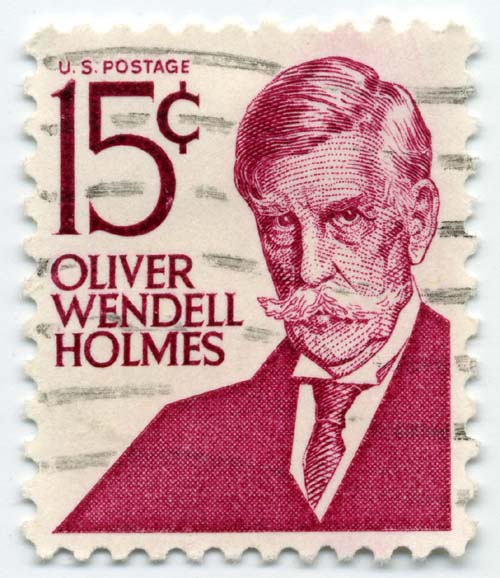
Oliver Wendell Holmes

- Suffragettes, Elizabeth Cady Stanton, Carrie Chapman Catt, and Lucretia Mott, 1948. Suffragists joined ranks with the abolitionists as the Civil War grew near, and were active throughout the Civil War and after. In return, abolitionists such as Frederick Douglass supported women's suffrage following the Civil War. "100 years of progress of women, 1848–1948" is written below the portraits 1948 issue.
- Oliver Wendell Holmes, Colonel served as a Union officer in combat and on a general's staff. He later served on the Supreme court and influenced legal thought regarding national economic regulation. 1968 issue.

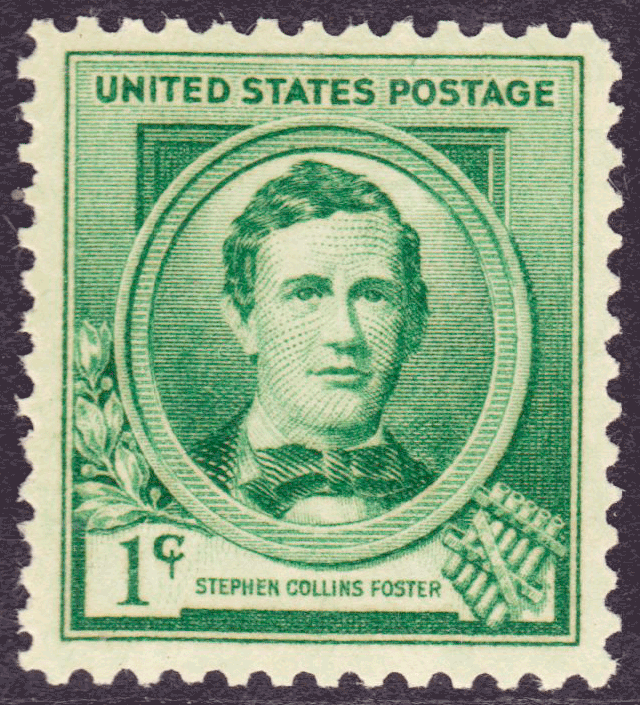
Stephen C. Foster

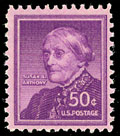
Susan B. Anthony

- Stephen C. Foster Songwriter of popular songs, "Oh, Susanna", "Away Down South", "Jeanie with the light brown hair". Moved to New York in 1860, wrote patriotic songs in declining career. 1940 issue.
- Susan B. Anthony before the war and during, was an agent for William Lloyd Garrison's American Anti-Slavery Society of New York. Subsequently she was an advocate for freedman suffrage in the 15th Amendment and sought to have it extended to women. 1955 issue.

The Second Wave of Immigration reshaped American society in its diversity and urban numbers leading to an explosion of internal commerce and providing a consumer base for the coming industrial age. At 28 percent, the "Gilded generation" fighting the Civil War included a larger share of immigrants than any other generation in America since colonial times.

Tides of immigration reinforced the natural population increases to the advantage of the Union on the battlefield. Both German and Irish immigrants formed several ethnic regiments. Both German and Irish immigration have been commemorated in U.S. stamps.

- German Immigration 300 years commemorative. 1983 issue.
- Irish immigration. (placeholder). 1999 issue. For image, see National Postal Museum.

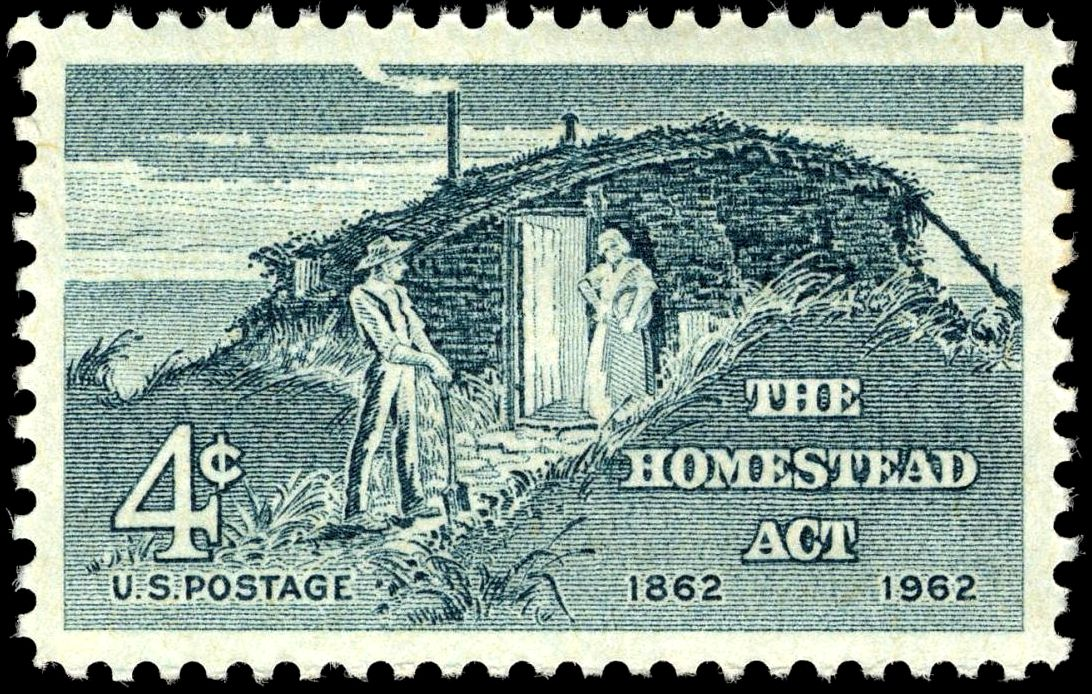
Homestead Act 1862

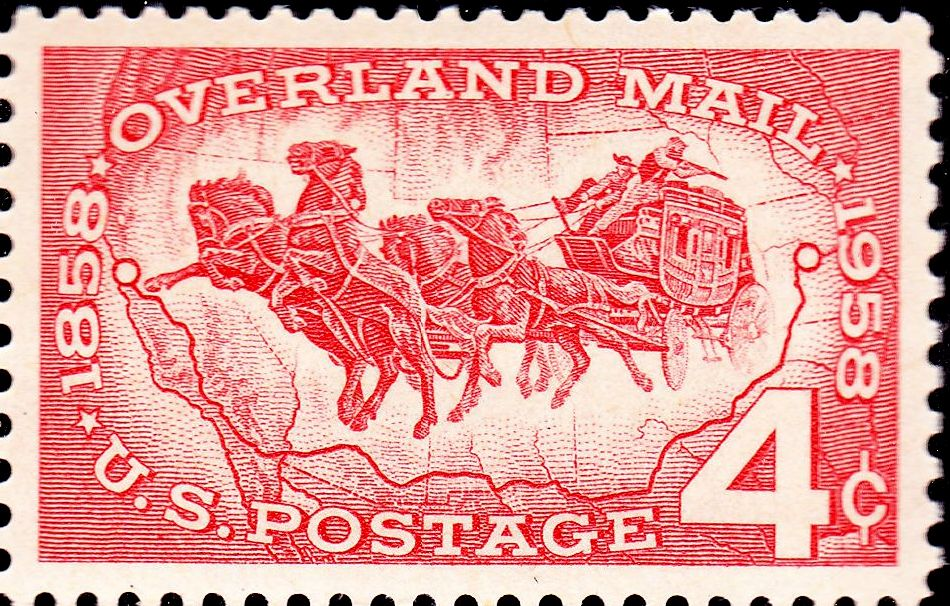
Overland mail delivery

- Homestead Act was enacted by Congress in 1862. Grants free family-sized parcels for five year residence. Agricultural growth meets Union demands and supplies wheat harvests to Europe. 1962 issue.
- Overland mail delivery was primarily by stagecoach; it would replace the Pony Express; stagecoach would be replaced by railroads. 1958 issue.

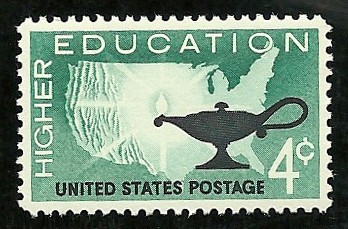
Land grant colleges, 1862

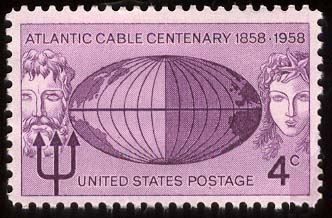
Trans-Atlantic cable, 1858, 1865

The 100th anniversary of law creating land-grant colleges and universities was commemorated on November 14, 1962 to coincide with the annual meeting of The Association of State Universities and Land Grant Colleges. The design by Henry K. Bencsath features a lamp of learning against a bas-relief map of the continental United States.

Throughout the Civil War, efforts continued to develop communications with Europe via telegraph by a trans-Atlantic cable. The first had been laid in 1858 but only functioned three weeks. The initial project was led by Cyrus West Field and the Atlantic Telegraph Company. Efforts continued with much improved technology in 1865 and 1866. A 4-cent commemorative was issued on the 100th anniversary of the first attempt. 1958 issue.

During the conflict, two additional free-soil states were admitted, which along with Lincoln's reconstruction, moved the country inexorably towards the number for three-fourths states required in a constitutional amendment to abolish slavery by December 1865.

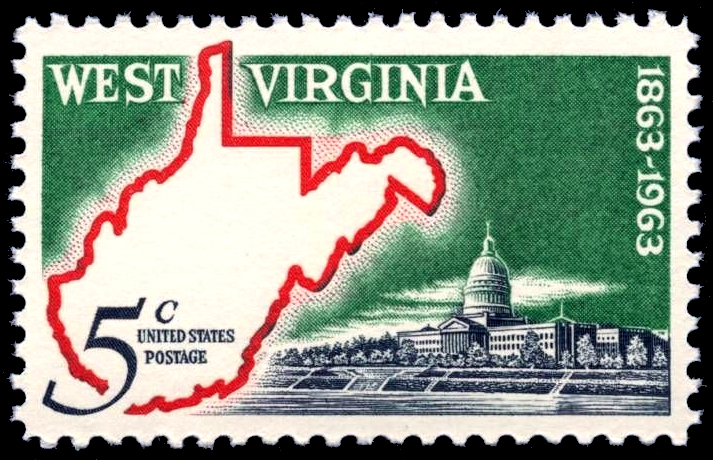
West Virginia statehood, June 20, 1863

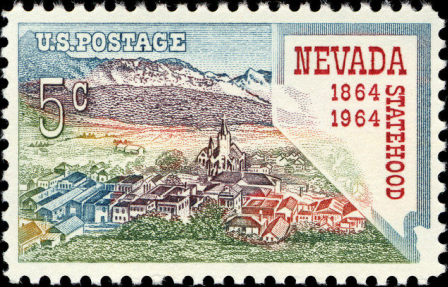
Nevada statehood, October 31, 1864

- West Virginia was established by loyalist Virginians in Constitutional Convention and accepted by Congress into the Union in 1863. 1963 issue.
- Nevada experienced a silver rush (the Comstock Lode) which led to its statehood before accumulating the population of earlier states. 1964 issue.

==== Technology ====
Inventors contributed to both sides of the conflict, most notably for the Union in fundamentally strategically important venues, enlarging on its material advantages over the Confederacy.

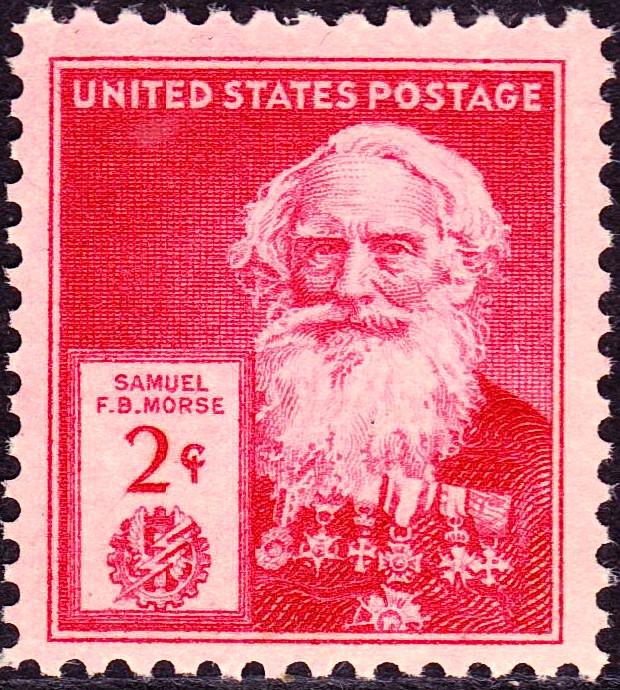
Samuel Morse

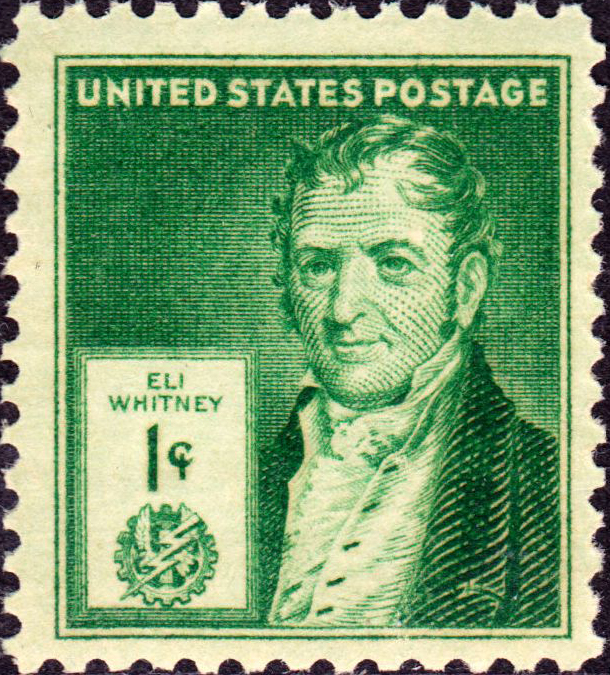
Eli Whitney

- Samuel Morse invented the telegraph which allowed Lincoln to listen in on direct communications among army generals from his office in the Army Department. Grant used the telegraph to communicate instantaneously with his divisional commanders in the field, setting up telegraph wires at the end of each day's march. 1940 issue.
- Eli Whitney invented interchangeable parts in rifled musket manufacture for the Union and supervised machinery in Connecticut. Field blacksmiths could salvage unbroken parts from a battlefield for immediate reissue in Union armies. Whitney's technological gift was equally crucial to the Confederacy: his invention of the cotton gin transformed cotton into a viable commercial product, fostering an enormous growth of the Southern slave-based agricultural economy through which the C. S. A. hoped to thrive as a self-sufficient nation. 1940 issue.

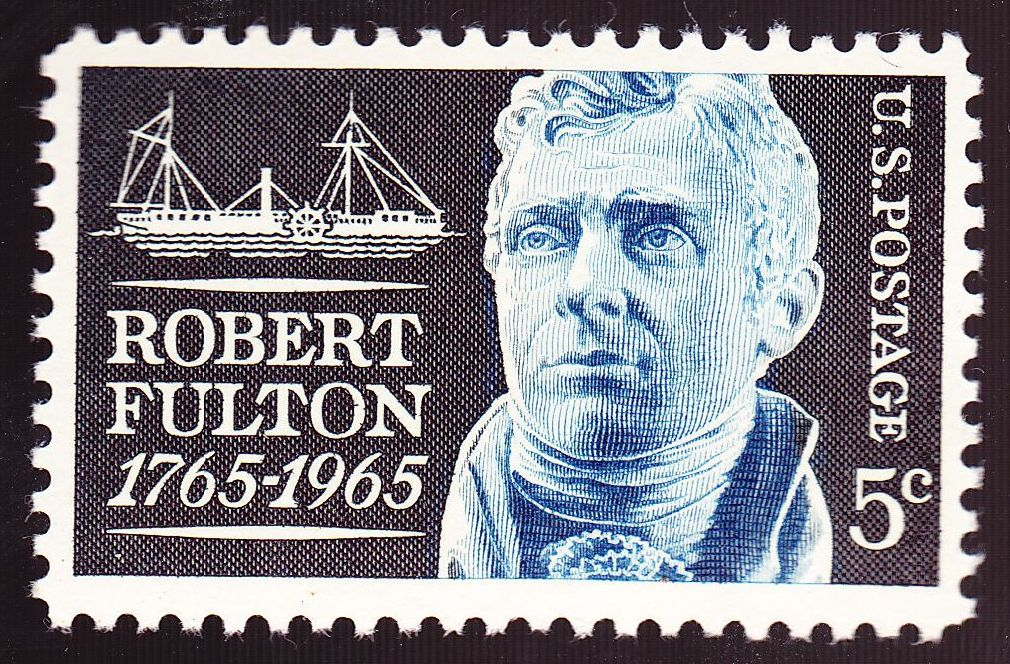
Robert Fulton invented the steamboat

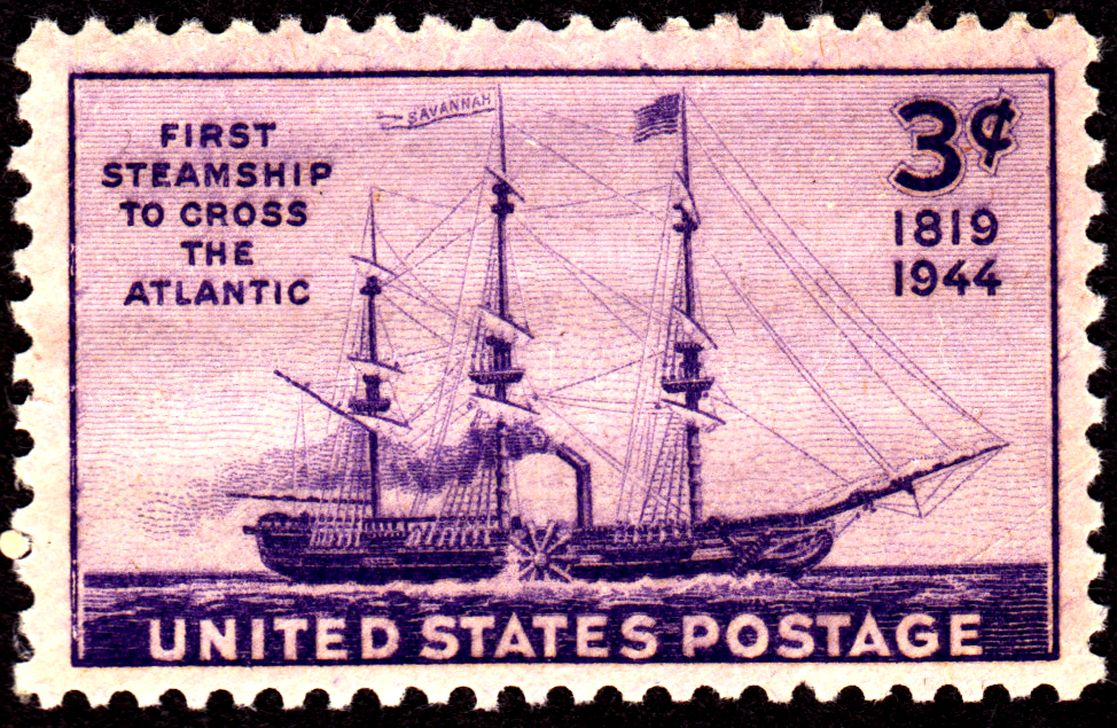
The s.b. 'Savannah crossed the Atlantic

- Robert Fulton invented the steamboat. First sidewheelers were used in smaller rivers and bays, then stearn-wheelers became powerful enough to navigate upstream in the Mississippi River. 1965 issue.
- The steamboat (s.b.) Savannah proved that the technology could cross the Atlantic. Its namesake C.S.S. ironclad Savannah attacked the Union blockade. Union steam-driven gunboats would the linchpin of the North's naval blockade. 1944 issue.

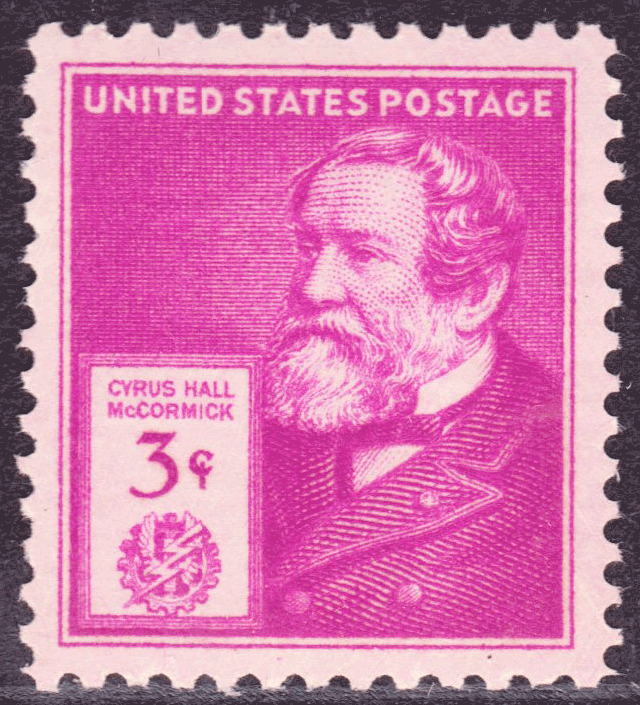
Cyrus McCormick

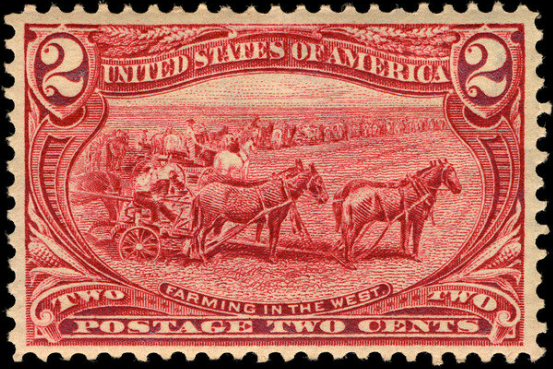
Mechanical horse-drawn farming

- Cyrus McCormick invented a mechanical reaper which along with other mechanical innovations enabled the North to feed itself, as well as its armies in the field at war and in garrison, and to export grain to Europe during the 1860s drought there. Grain export from the Union in part counterbalanced the economic pull of "King Cotton" to thwart recognition of the Confederacy. —Consolidated his manufactures from Virginia to Chicago in the 1840s, active in the Presbyterian Church and Democratic politics. 1898 issue.

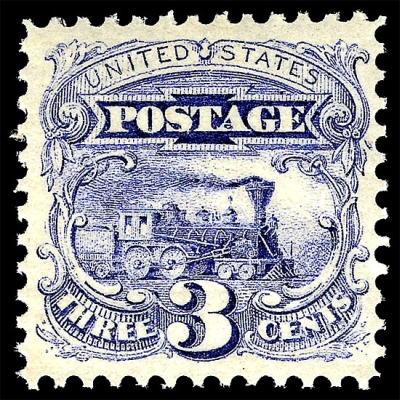
Rail transport moved armies
both Union and Confederate

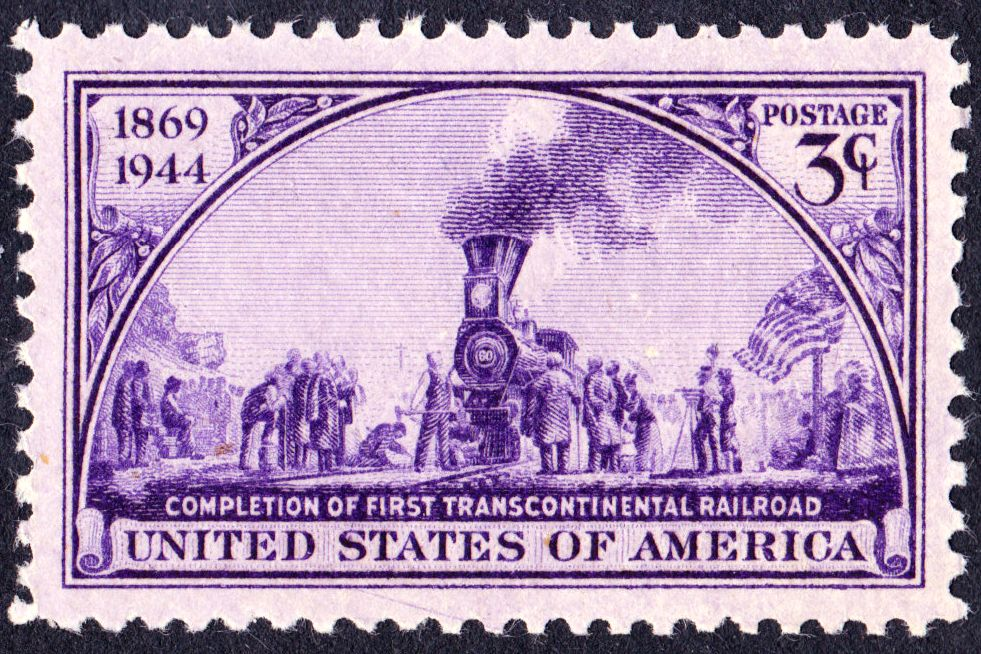
Transcontinental Railroad
begun 1863 completed 1869

- Peter Cooper constructed the first steam locomotive in the United States and railroads adopted a standard gauge to facilitate military transport during the Civil War. 1901 issue.
- First transcontinental railroad was initiated by an 1862 Act of Congress, Pacific Railway Act. Union Pacific Railroad uses mostly Irish immigrants; Central Pacific building from the west coast imports Chinese laborers. Additional land grants doubling their acreage are made to the railroads July 2, 1864. 1944 issue.

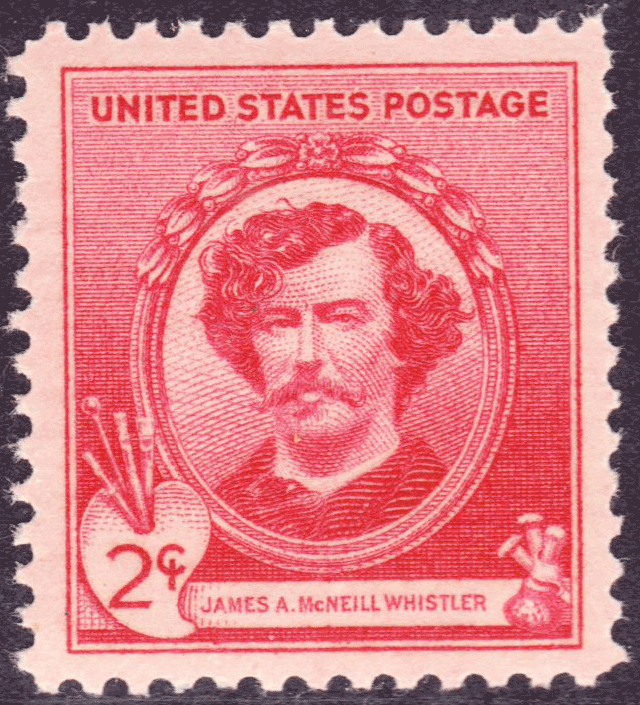
James A. M. Whistler

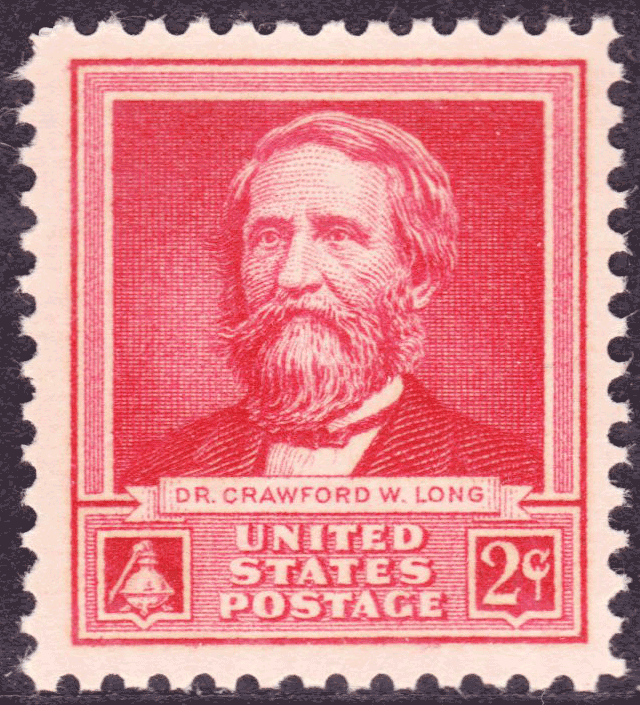
Crawford W. Long

- James Abbott McNeill Whistler Painter, made military maps prior to civil war, draftsman and engraver for the Coast and Geodetic Survey in Washington. Pursued artistic career in England and France during war years, never returning to the U.S. 1940 issue.
- Crawford W. Long Scientist, medical doctor who developed ether for surgery used extensively on both sides. 1940 issue.

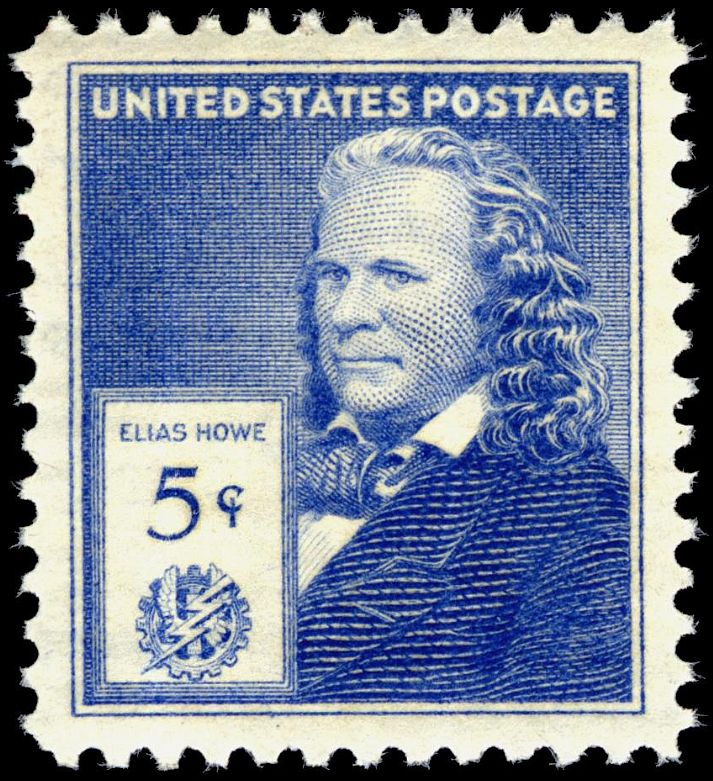
Elias Howe

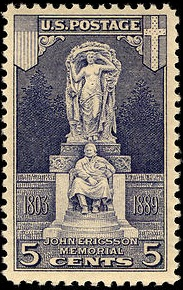
John Ericsson

- Elias Howe Inventor of sewing machine of standard sized uniforms used in the Union army. Enlisted in the 17th Connecticut Infantry of the Union Army during the Civil War, regimental postmaster. 1940 issue.
- John Ericsson invented the steam powered, screw driven iron-clad Monitor which defeated the Virginia at the Battle of Hampton Roads. The successors sustained the Union naval blockade wherever the Confederates built an iron-clad to break the blockade of wooden ships and they were used in fort bombardment. 1926 issue.

=== Famous people and the Civil War ===
==== Authors and the Civil War ====
Prominent authors of the Civil War generation later were commemorated in stamps in view of their important career-long contributions to American literature. Several Transcentendalist authors promoted immediate abolition and war. Some authors served as nurses, or wrote without any direct participation in the conflict.

"Transcendental" generation, born 1792 to 1821. As a generation in their twenties they provided the original core of the 1830s evangelical and abolitionist movements. Their extremism, whether of William Lloyd Garrison or Nat Turner, ended any attempt at the compromises by the "old men" meeting with Lincoln in the Willard Hotel on the eve of Fort Sumter. At the onset of the Civil War, they were in their fifties, Massachusetts "Black Republicans", and South Carolina "Fire Eaters", "fully prepared to shed younger blood to attain what they knew was right." In their old age, they watched Reconstruction disintegrate and youthful causes fall into scorn.

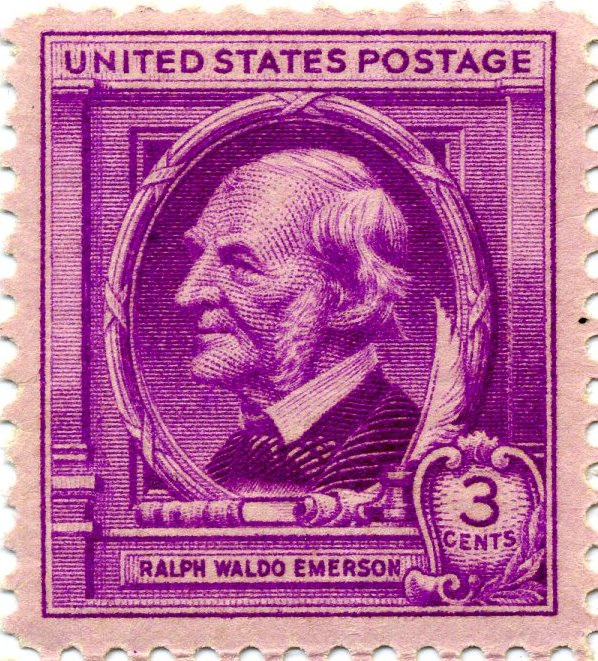
Ralph Waldo Emerson

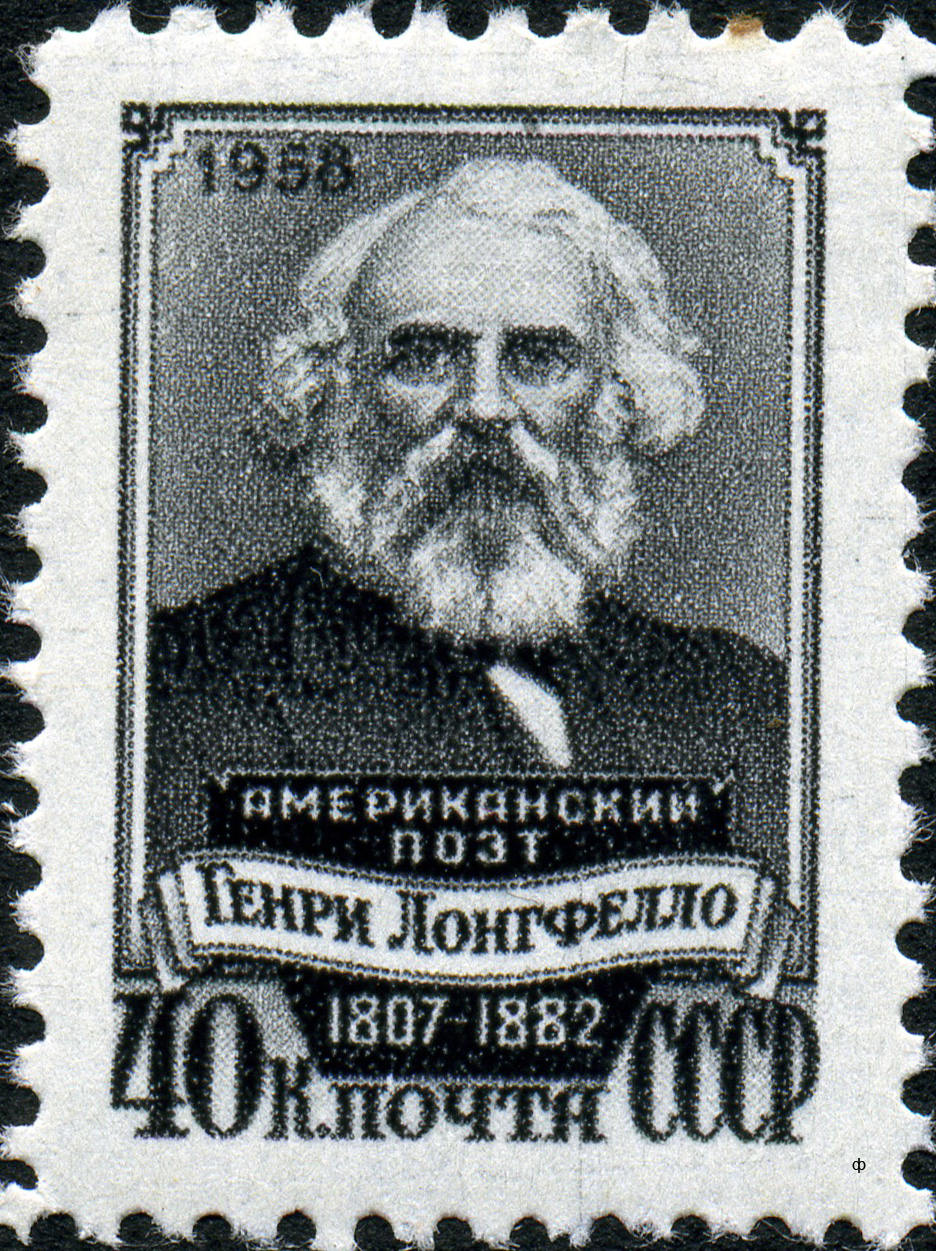
Henry Wadsworth Longfellow

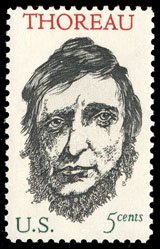
Henry David Thoreau

- Ralph Waldo Emerson wrote The Conduct of Life about current issues as an Abolitionist. He embraced war for a national rebirth. As civil war approached, he accepted political means could not redress immoral law. His "Lecture on slavery" was moderately anti-slavery, but at war, he said the South should be "pounded instead of negotiated into a peace." 1940 issue.
- Henry Wadsworth Longfellow during the 1860s supported abolitionism and after the Civil War hoped for reconciliation among the states. Wrote "Poems on Slavery". A friend of Charles Sumner. His eldest son joined the Union army. USSR 1958 issue.
- Henry David Thoreau wrote A Plea for Captain John Brown, leading Abolitionists to accept Brown as a martyr; armies of the North sang Brown's praises on the march. 1967 issue.

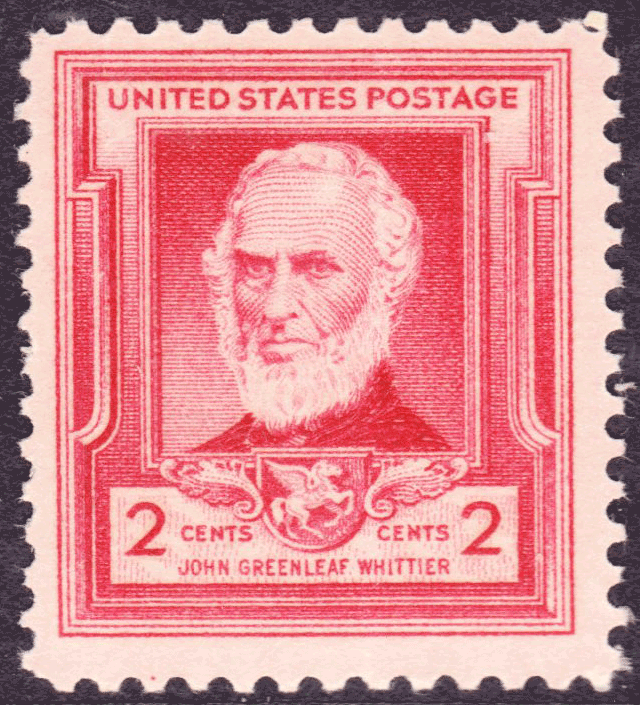
John Greenleaf Whittier

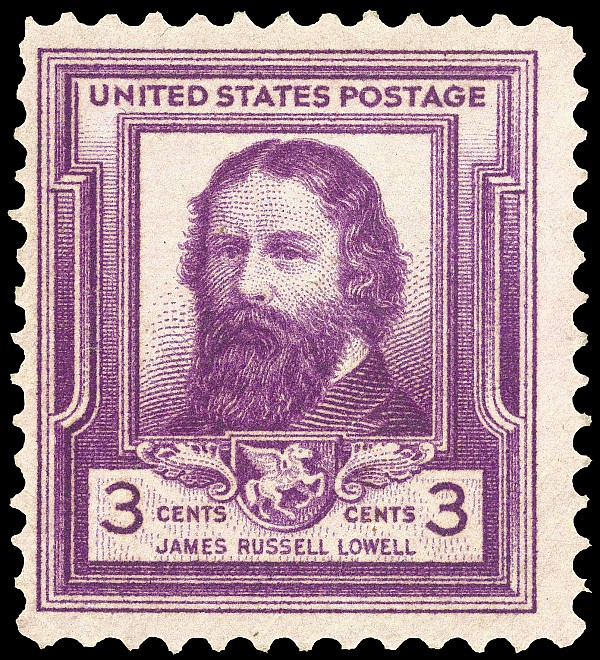
James Russel Lowell

- John Greenleaf Whittier Poet, Abolitionist after 1830, lecturing and lobbying, on several occasions nearly escaping bodily harm. Wrote for Pennsylvania Freeman and the National Era. Wrote Home Ballads 1860, In War Time 1864 One of the "household poets" along with Bryant and Longfellow. 1940 issue.
- James Russell Lowell Poet, Aboltionist after 1845. Succeeded Longfellow as professor of modern languages at Harvard, published Atlantic Monthly. Second series of Biglow Papers published in the Atlantic during the Civil War. 1940 issue.

"Gilded" generation, born 1822 to 1842. The same generation who flocked to the California gold rush in their teens were most of the actual participants and combat casualties of the American Civil War. They expected a quick adventure, perhaps glory or profit besides. They would settle all the thundering hatred of their parents abolitionists and 'southrons' and then proceed with the settlement of the western frontier. For Gilded blacks, the war was a march toward "flesh-and-blood freedom". In their old age these Gilded would "later turn bitterly cynical about passionate crusades."

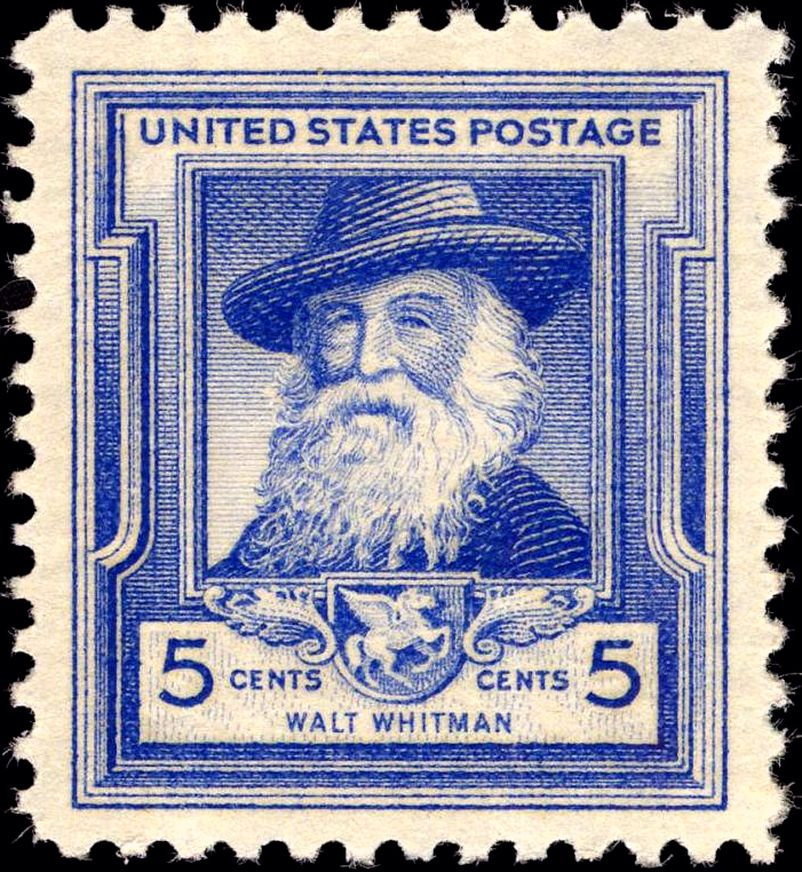
Walt Whitman

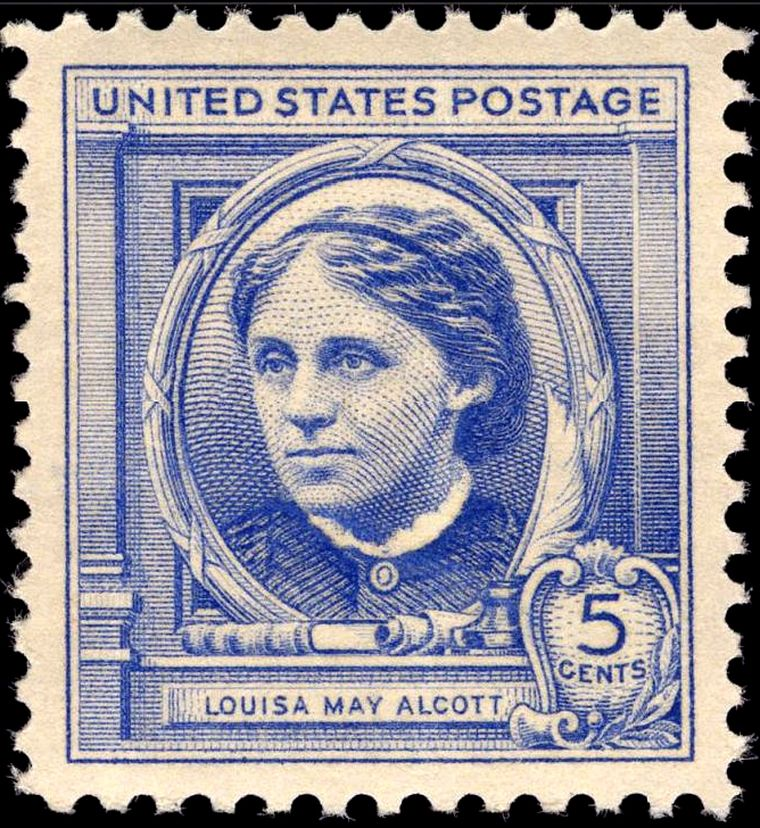
Louisa May Alcott

- Walt Whitman served as a nurse in Union hospitals around DC and wrote, "The great army of the sick". Though "To Thee Old Cause" called for war as a rite of national purification from materialism and political corruption, Whitman was not an abolitionist, believing North and South reconcilable. "Beat! Beat! Drums!" was a call to arms following the First Bull Run disaster. "Drum-Taps" transitions to grief for the wounded and dying. "Sequel" contained tributes to Lincoln's martyrdom. 1948 issue.
- Louisa May Alcott served as a nurse in a Georgetown, DC hospital, wrote for the Atlantic and abolitionist Commonwealth magazines exposing hospital conditions. Earlier wrote pro-abolitionist poem, "With a rose, that bloomed on the day of John Brown's Martyrdom", and later, "Little Women" of a northern family with a war-absent patriarch. 1940 issue.

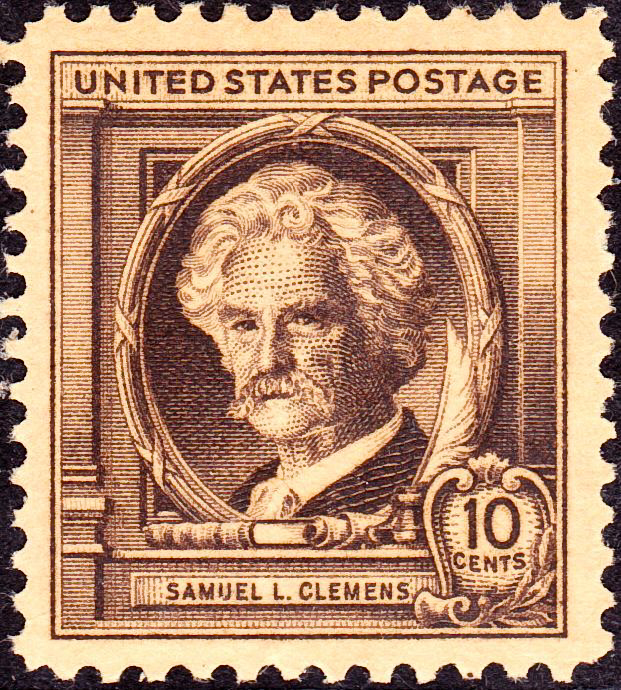
Samuel L. Clemens

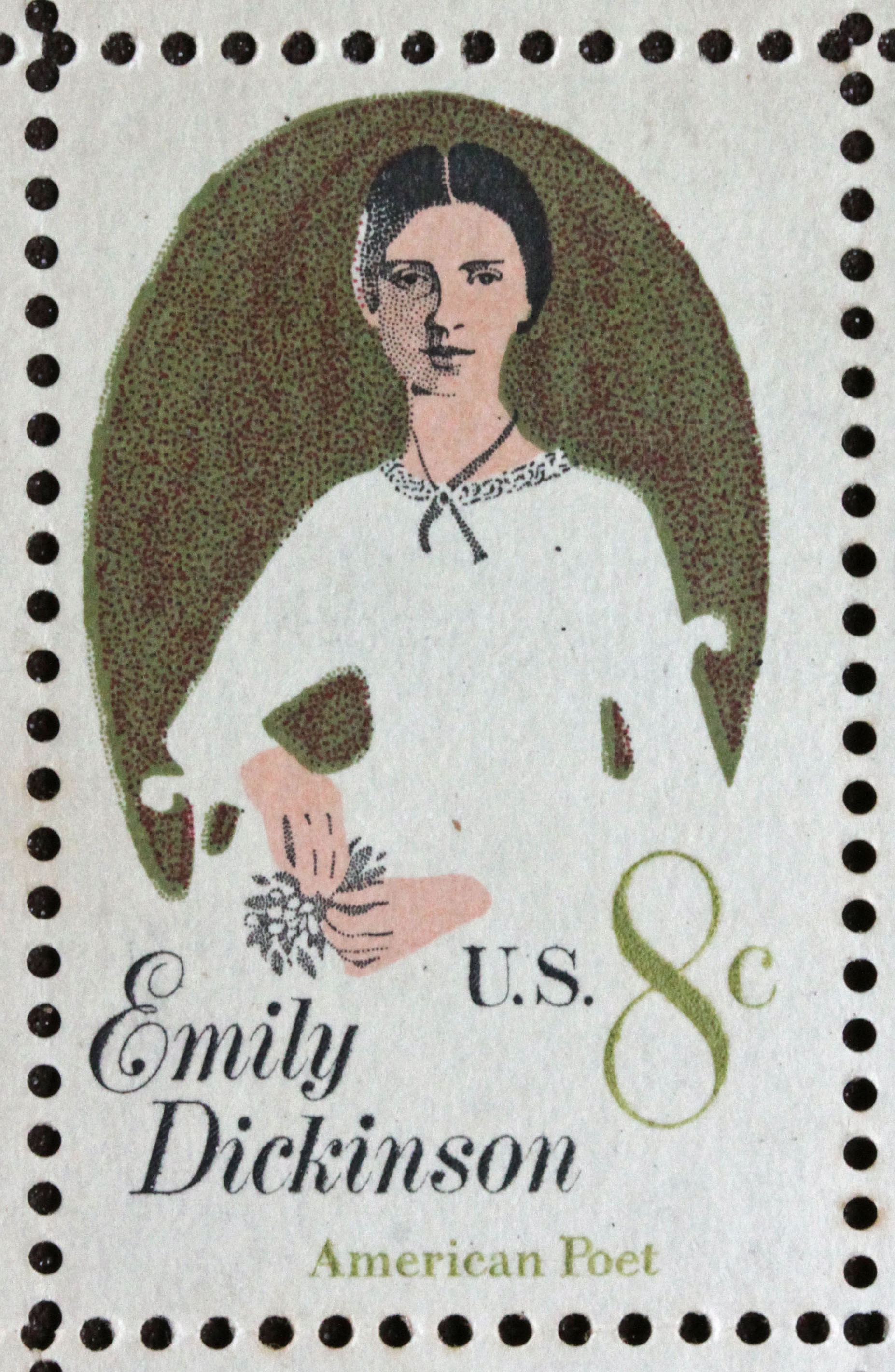
Emily Dickinson

- Samuel L. Clemens (Mark Twain) enlisted briefly in a Confederate local unit. He then left for Nevada to work for his brother, a senior official in the Federal government. Twain's The Private History of a Campaign That Failed told how he and his friends volunteered for two weeks before disbanding their company. He moved to Nevada and avoided further service. 1940 issue.
- Emily Dickinson wrote at her home and corresponded with a Union abolitionist officer who encouraged her writing. 1971 issue.

==== Presidents and the Civil War ====
Besides Abraham Lincoln in the United States and Jefferson Davis in the Confederate states, nine U.S. presidents had Civil War experience.

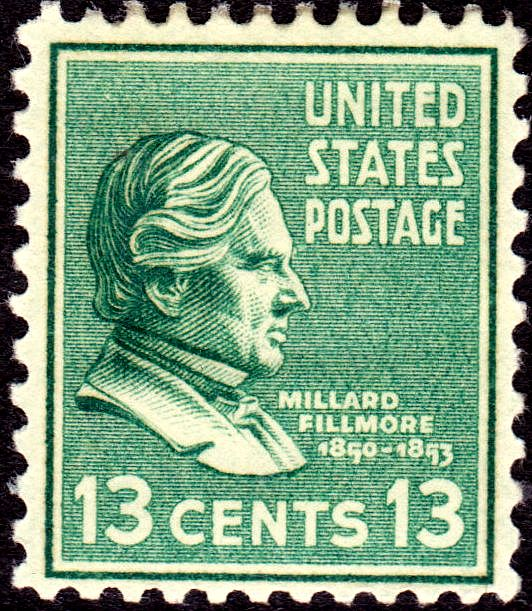
Millard Fillmore

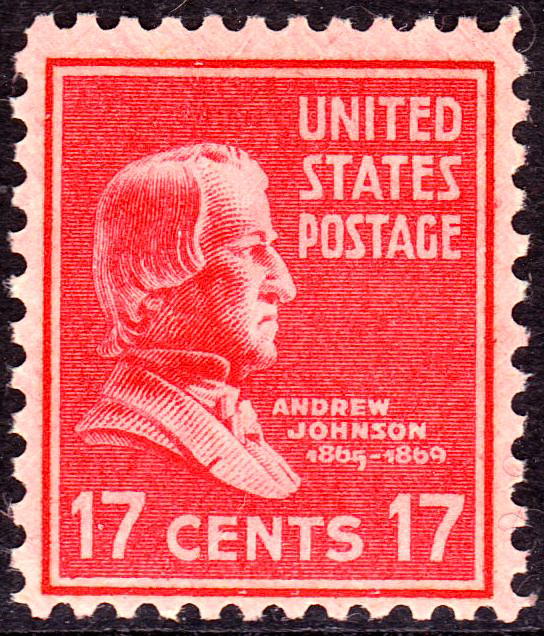
Andrew Johnson

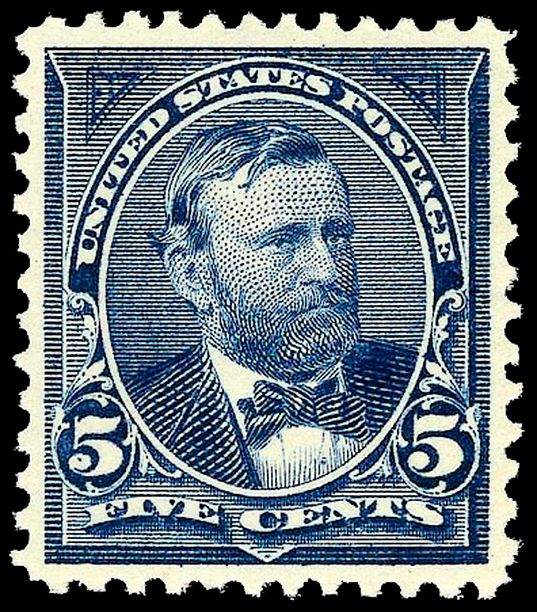
Ulysses S. Grant

- Millard Fillmore, After his presidency, Major in the militia during the war the Buffalo NY Union Continentals, a corps of home guards, but never saw combat. 1938 Issue
- Andrew Johnson Lone U.S. Senator holding his seat from a state in rebellion. Military governor of Tennessee, Brigadier General. Lincoln's 1864 "Union" running mate. Controversial "Presidential Reconstruction" followed by activity in Democratic party. 1938 issue.
- Ulysses S. Grant Began service in 21st Illinois Volunteer Infantry, commander District of Cairo at Fort Donelson, Shiloh, Army of the Tenn., Vicksburg, Div. of the Miss., Chattanooga, Knoxville, General-in-Chief, operated as corps commander in eastern theater, Overland Campaign, war of attrition, Richmond-Petersburg campaign, Appomattox. Two term president during Congressional Reconstruction. 1898 issue.

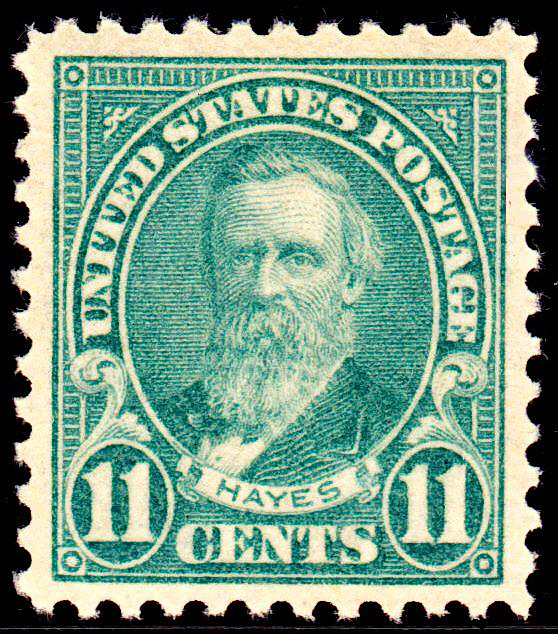
Rutherford B. Hayes

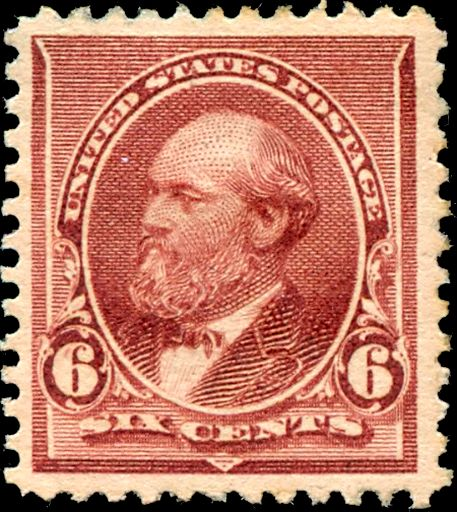
James A. Garfield

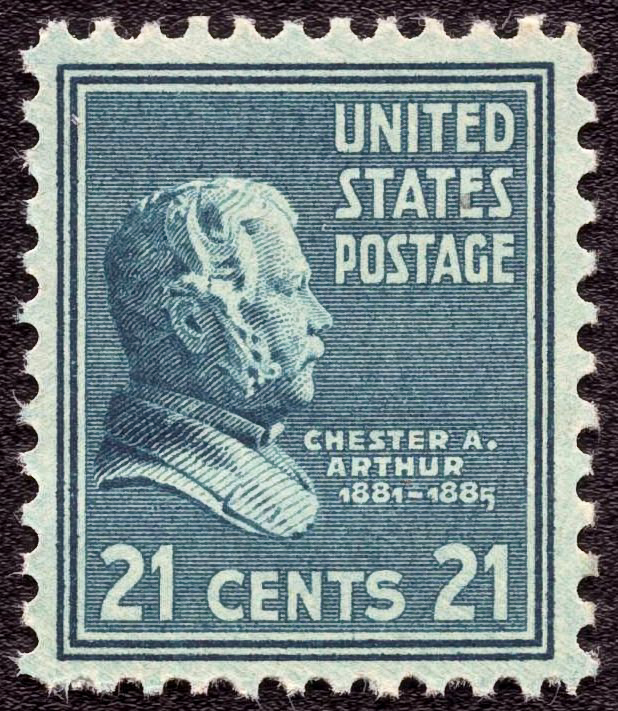
Chester A. Arthur

- Rutherford B. Hayes, a Major General of volunteers, 23rd Ohio Infantry, elected radical congressman 1864. Reform governor, expanded presidency, fought for veterans pensions. 1922 issue.
- James A. Garfield, a Major General of volunteers, 42nd Ohio Infantry. Fought in Kentucky, 20th Brigade of Army of Ohio. Shiloh. Chief of staff, Army of the Cumberland. Chicamaugua. Congressman from 1863, assassinated as president. 1890 issue.
- Chester A. Arthur was army engineer in chief of the New York Militia. 1938 issue

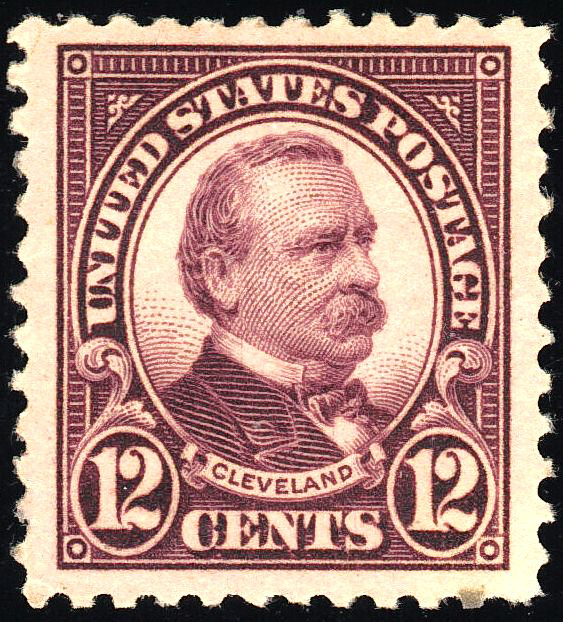
Grover Cleveland

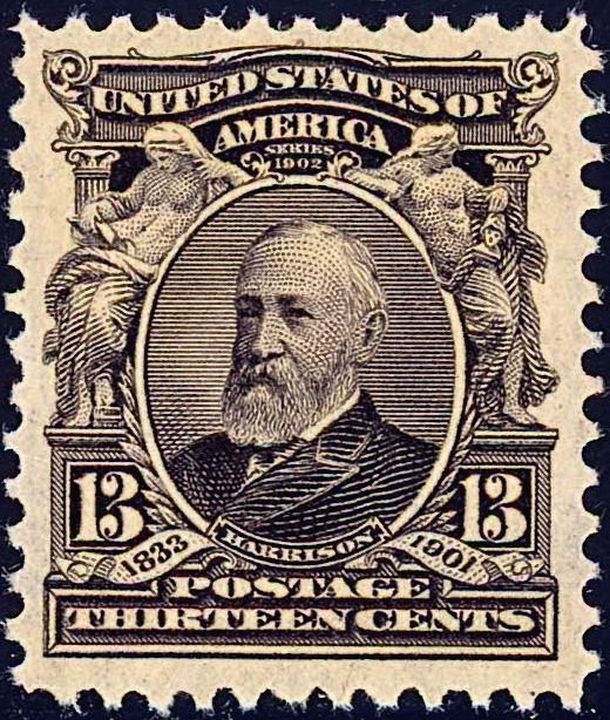
Benjamin Harrison

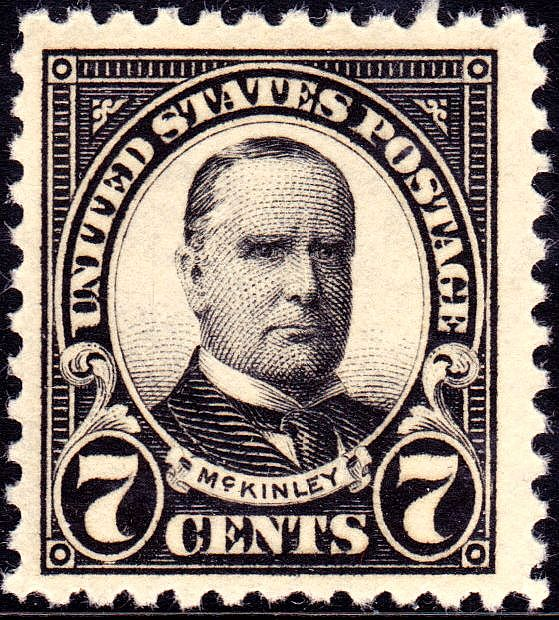
William McKinley

- Grover Cleveland was drafted but paid for a substitute. Active in NJ Democratic politics. 1923 Issue.
- Benjamin Harrison, Brigadier General 70th Indiana Infantry, fought in Kentucky, Tennessee, Georgia, Peachtree Creek. U.S. Senator for veterans pensions. As president, Sherman Anti-Trust Act, McKinley Tariff, six western states 1889–1890. 1902 issue.
- William McKinley, Major in the 23rd Ohio Infantry. He fought in western Virginia, Antietam, Winchester, Fisher's Hill, Cedar Creek. Subsequently in the Spanish–American War, appointed several former confederates to high rank as a form of sectional reconciliation. Assassinated as president. 1923 issue.

==== Abraham Lincoln ====
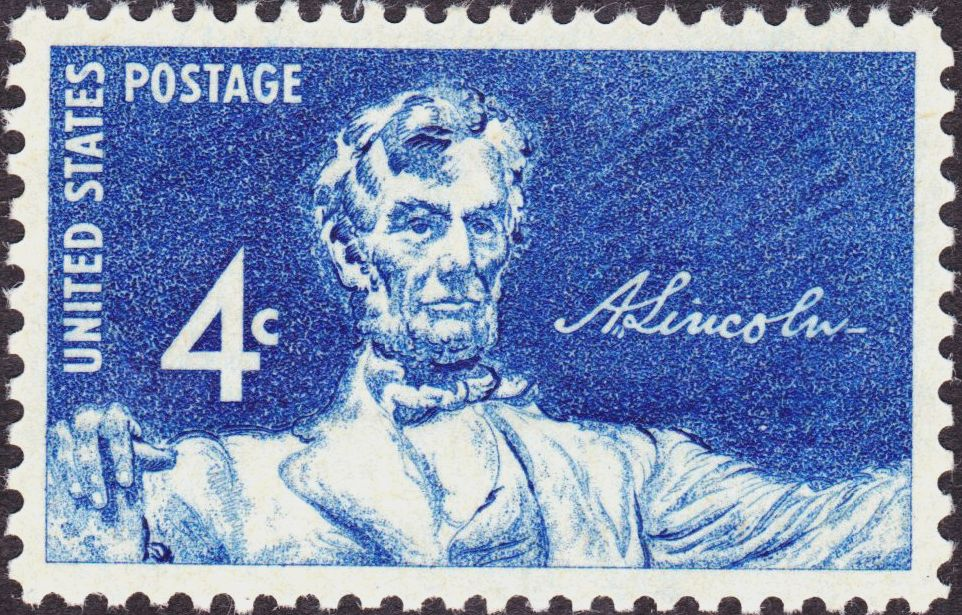
Abraham Lincoln

Abraham Lincoln is perhaps the most commemorated of the Civil War generation on U.S. postage. Pictured here as his statue in the Lincoln Memorial in Washington, DC. 1958 issue.

In the 2009 issue of 42-cent Lincoln stamps, Lincoln was pictured in four stages of life: as rail-splitter, as lawyer, as politician, and as president. 2009 issue.

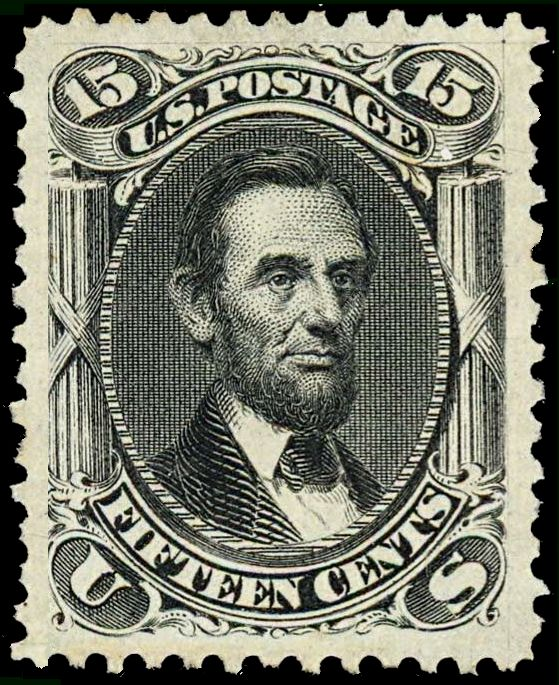
1866

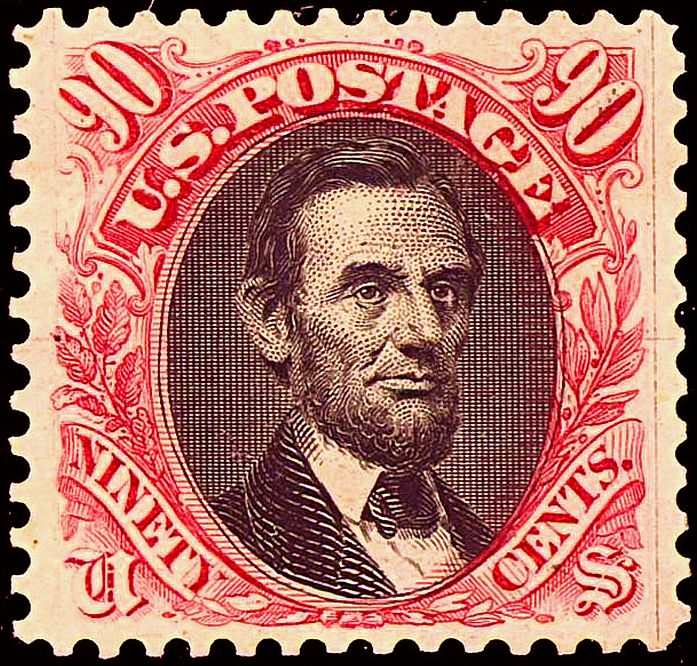
1869

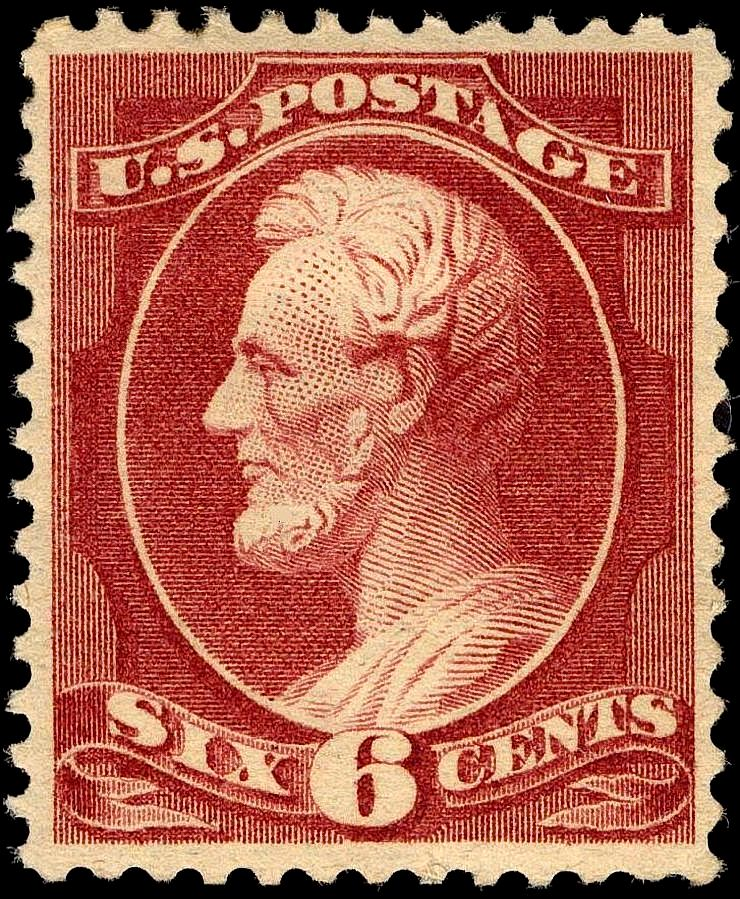
1882

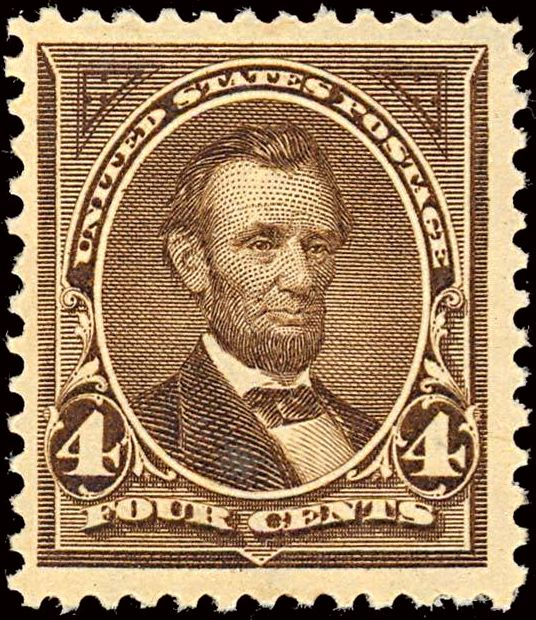
1894

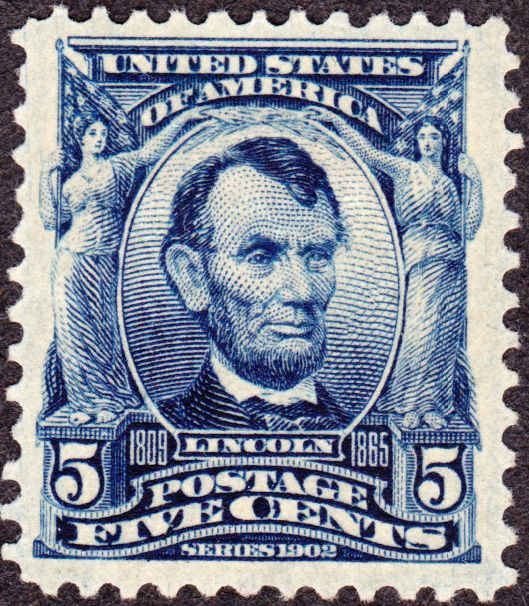
1903

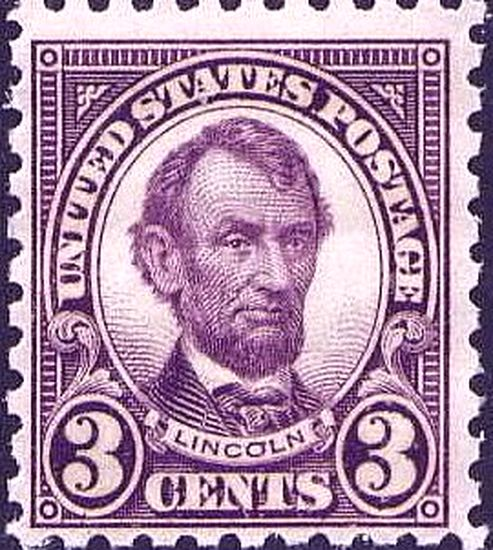
1923

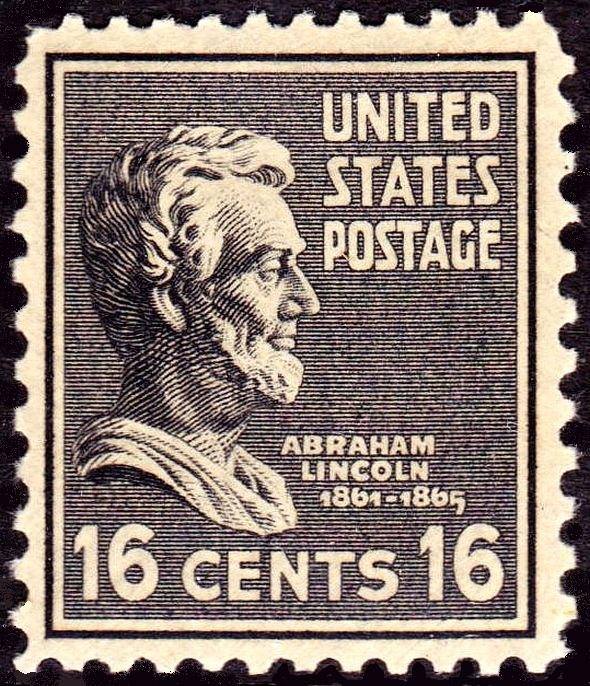
1938

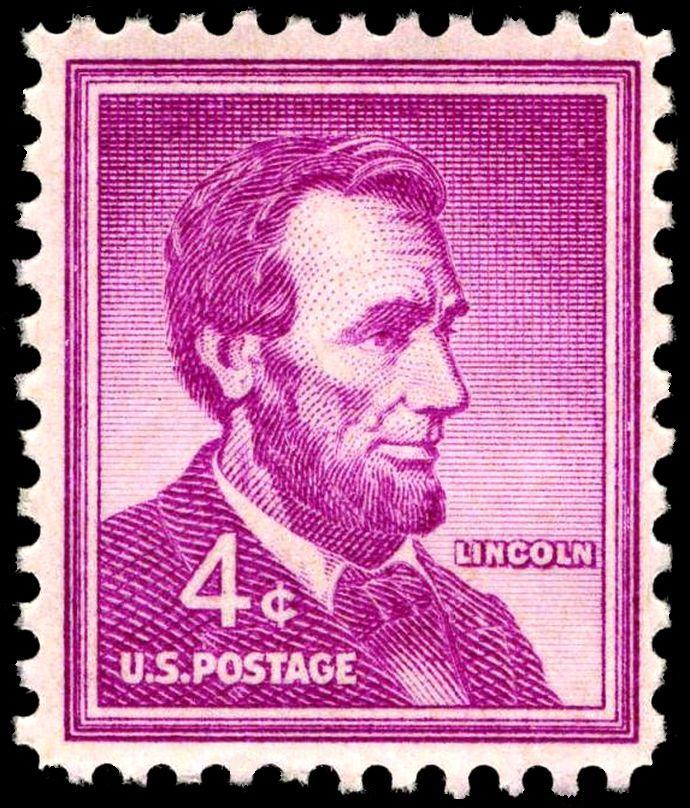
1954

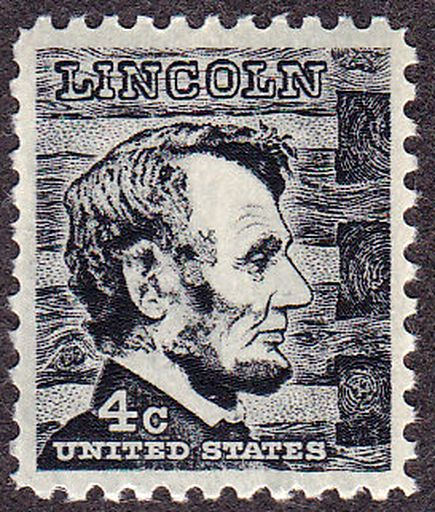
1965

Lincoln was elected in 1860 and won reelection in 1864, the first president since Andrew Jackson to do so. The Confederacy initiated hostilities while he was seeking to "hold, occupy and possess", not repossess federal property. Lincoln responded with a naval blockade and raising troops to restore the Union, and he successfully expanded the war effort throughout the duration of hostilities. He served as an active commander-in-chief, naming his top generals and admirals. In his presidential capacity he marshaled support for the war across the north, border states and in Congress, and he led the Republican party in the initial steps of reconstruction of former Confederate territory.

Lincoln's war policy was to press offensives into the South on multiple fronts to destroy Confederate armies and restore the Union. By December 1864 his peace policy was end of rebel hostilities and the end of slavery. His legislative program included the Homestead Act, a transcontinental railroad, land grants for colleges, a higher tariff and monetary centralization by the national banking act. His Proclamation of Amnesty sought to restore states by 10% of the 1860 vote swearing future loyalty to the union. He preserved the Union and liberated the slaves. Lincoln's appearance in U. S. definitive issues was long considered all but obligatory.

== See also ==
- Army and Navy stamp issues of 1936-1937
- Commemoration of the American Civil War
- Postage stamps and postal history of the Confederate States
- Postage stamps and postal history of the United States
- Stamps of the American Civil War Wikimedia Commons Category for stamp images
- Template:US stamp locator

== Bibliography ==
Civil War on stamps and envelopes

- Benjamin, Maynard H., The History of Envelopes 2002, Envelope Manufacturers Association and EMA Foundation for Paper-Based Communications. For political impacts of postal system, unifying but also dividing the nation. chapters on "prelude to war", "wanted:riders" and "the war begins".
- Boyd, Steven R. Patriotic Envelopes of the Civil War: the iconography of Union and Confederate covers 2010. ISBN 978-0-8071-3796-3
- Boyd, Steven R., "The Medium is the Message: Union Civil War Patriotic Envelopes and their Impact, 1861–1865" Winton M. Blount Symposium on Postal History, November 3–4, 2006. Smithsonian National Postal Museum, Washington, D.C. Abstracts of Papers and Panels.
- Chapter 4: Shaping National Identity with Commemoratives, 1920s–30s (2006) "Viewing American Stamps" George Mason University. Viewed February 22, 2014.
- Charles, Harry K., "American Civil War Postage Due: North and South", Postal History Symposium, Nov. 2012. Viewed February 19, 2014.
- Dodson, Larry (2006). A Philatelic Tour of the American Civil War (also known as the War between the States). ATA Handbook 155. Arlington, TX: American Topical Association. Single and multiple battles, one hundred Confederate and Union men with biographies. Transportation section identifies trains, ships and even an ambulance. Flags, uniforms and places are followed by a section of literature and films, composers, authors, poets and sculptors that reflect some aspect of the Civil War.
- Hattaway, Herman and Ethan S. Rafuse. The Ongoing Civil War: New Versions of Old Stories 2004 ISBN 978-0-8262-6253-0. For information concerning individual stamps and collectors interpretations.
- Marszalek, John F. "Philatelic pugilists: the 1937 Civil War stamp battle demonstrated the longevity of the South's memory" in Columbiad: a quarterly review of the war between the states. vol. 3 no. 2 (Summer 1999), p. [146]-157.
- National Postal Museum. The Civil War: 10 years. Viewed February 19, 2014. For portions of the exhibit A Nation Divided available online.
- Snee, Charles. ed., Scott's Specialized Catalogue of United States Stamps & Covers, 2012, ISBN 0-89487-475-6. Comprehensively lists the issues of U.S. postage stamps for the United States and the Confederate States.
- Time-Life Books. (1995) The Civil War : a collection of U.S. commemorative stamps. Alexandria VA. ISBN 978-0-8094-9191-9.
- U.S. Postal Service. 1994. "Civil War: 1861, the war between the states, 1865."
- Worldcat. United States History Civil War, 1861–1865 on postage stamps there are thirteen entries. viewed February 13, 2013.

General

- Bowman, Shearer Davis. At the Precipice: Americans North and South During the Secession Crisis. (2010) ISBN 978-0-8078-9567-2. For perspectives on the run up to the American Civil War in politics and culture.
- Coulter, E. Merton. "The Confederate States of America 1861–1865. (1950) ISBN 978-0-8071-0007-3. vol. VII. History of the South, Louisiana State University. For general history of the Confederacy and events surrounding its existence.
- Craven, Avery O. "The growth of Southern nationalism 1848–1861" (1953) ISBN 978-0-8071-0006-6 vol. VI. History of the South, Louisiana State University. For Intellectual and political developments and events leading up to the American Civil War.
- Foner, Eric. (1988) "Reconstruction: America's unfinished revolution: 1863–1877. ISBN 978-0-06-093716-4 For an understanding of Reconstruction reaching across the administrations of Lincoln, Johnson and Grant.
- Freehling, William W., The road to disunion: secessionists triumphant: 1854–1861 2007. ISBN 978-0-19-505815-4. For perspectives on the run up to the American Civil War in politics and culture.
- Goodwin, Doris Kearns. "Team of Rivals: the political genius of Abraham Lincoln" (2006) ISBN 978-1-4165-4983-3. For Lincoln's use of the Telegraph.
- Hiedler, David Stephen, Jeanne T. Heidler, and David J. Coles, eds. Encyclopedia of the American Civil War: a political, social and military history. 2002. ISBN 978-0-393-04758-5. For biographies of civil war notables.
- Keegan, John. The American Civil War: a military history. 2009. ISBN 978-0-307-26343-8. For a survey of the Civil War and the military significance of various aspects of it.
- Straus, William & Neil Howe. Generations: the history of America's future, 1584 to 2069. 1991. ISBN 0-688-11912-3 paper. For general discussion of the secular crisis in American history that was the American Civil War. For important Americans from the "Transcendental Generation" born 1792 to 1821, and from the "Gilded Generation" born from 1822 to 1842.
- Wills, Gary. Lincoln at Gettysburg: the words that remade America (2006) ISBN 978-0-7432-9963-3. For an investigation into the cultural significance of the Gettysburg Address.
- Webster's Guide to American History" 1971. G. & C. Merriam Company, Publishers. SBN 87779-081-7. For general biographical references independent of WP biography citations.
- Wink, Jay. April 1865: the month that saved America 2002 ISBN 978-0-06-093088-2. For an explanation of how The Surrender terms made it possible for the nation to reunite after a civil war.
