= Postage stamps and postal history of the United States =

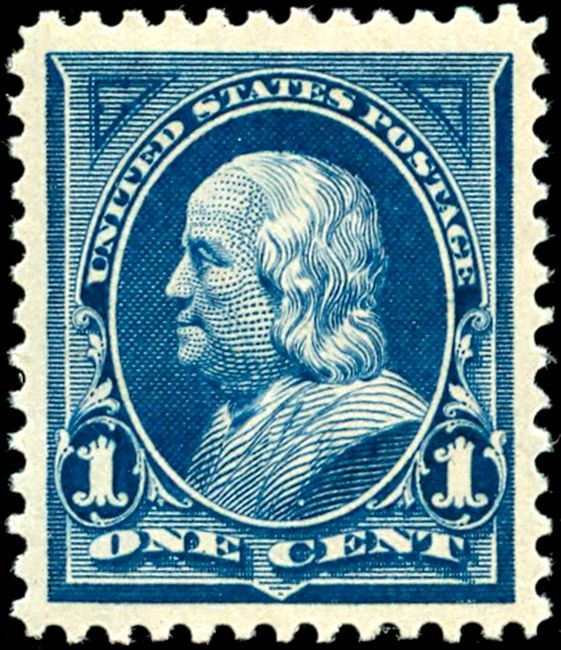
Benjamin Franklin postage stamp issued in 1895

Postal service in the United States began with the delivery of stampless letters whose cost was borne by the receiving person, later encompassed pre-paid letters carried by private mail carriers and provisional post offices, and culminated in a system of universal prepayment that required all letters to bear nationally issued adhesive postage stamps.

In the earliest days, ship captains arriving in port with stampless mail would advertise in the local newspaper names of those having mail and for them to come collect and pay for it, if not already paid for by the sender. Postal delivery in the United States was a matter of haphazard local organization until after the Revolutionary War, when eventually a national postal system was established. Stampless letters, paid for by the receiver, and private postal systems, were gradually phased out after the introduction of adhesive postage stamps, first issued by the U.S. government post office July 1, 1847, in the denominations of five and ten cents, with the use of stamps made mandatory in 1855.

The issue and use of adhesive postage stamps continued during the 19th century primarily for first-class mail. Each of these stamps generally bore the face or bust of an American president or another historically important statesman. However, once the Post Office realized during the 1890s that it could increase revenues by selling stamps as "collectibles", it began issuing commemorative stamps, first in connection with important national expositions, later for the anniversaries of significant American historical events. Continued technological innovation subsequently prompted the introduction of special stamps, such as those for use with airmail, zeppelin mail, registered mail, certified mail, and so on. Postage due stamps were issued for some time and were pasted by the post office to letters having insufficient postage with the postage due to be paid to the postal carrier at the receiving address.

Today, many stamps issued by the post office are self-adhesive, and no longer require that the stamps be "licked" to activate the glue on their back. In many cases, post office clerks now use Postal Value Indicators (PVI), which are computer labels, instead of stamps.

Where for a century-and-a-half or so, stamps were almost invariably denominated with their values (5 cent, 10 cent, etc.) the United States post office now sells non-denominated "forever" stamps for use on first-class and international mail. These stamps are still valid for the full rate even if there is a rate increase. However, for other uses, adhesive stamps with denomination indicators are still available and sold.

== Early postal history ==
Postal services began in the first half of the 17th century serving the first American colonies of Britain and France; today, the United States Postal Service is a large government organization providing a wide range of services across the United States and its territories abroad.

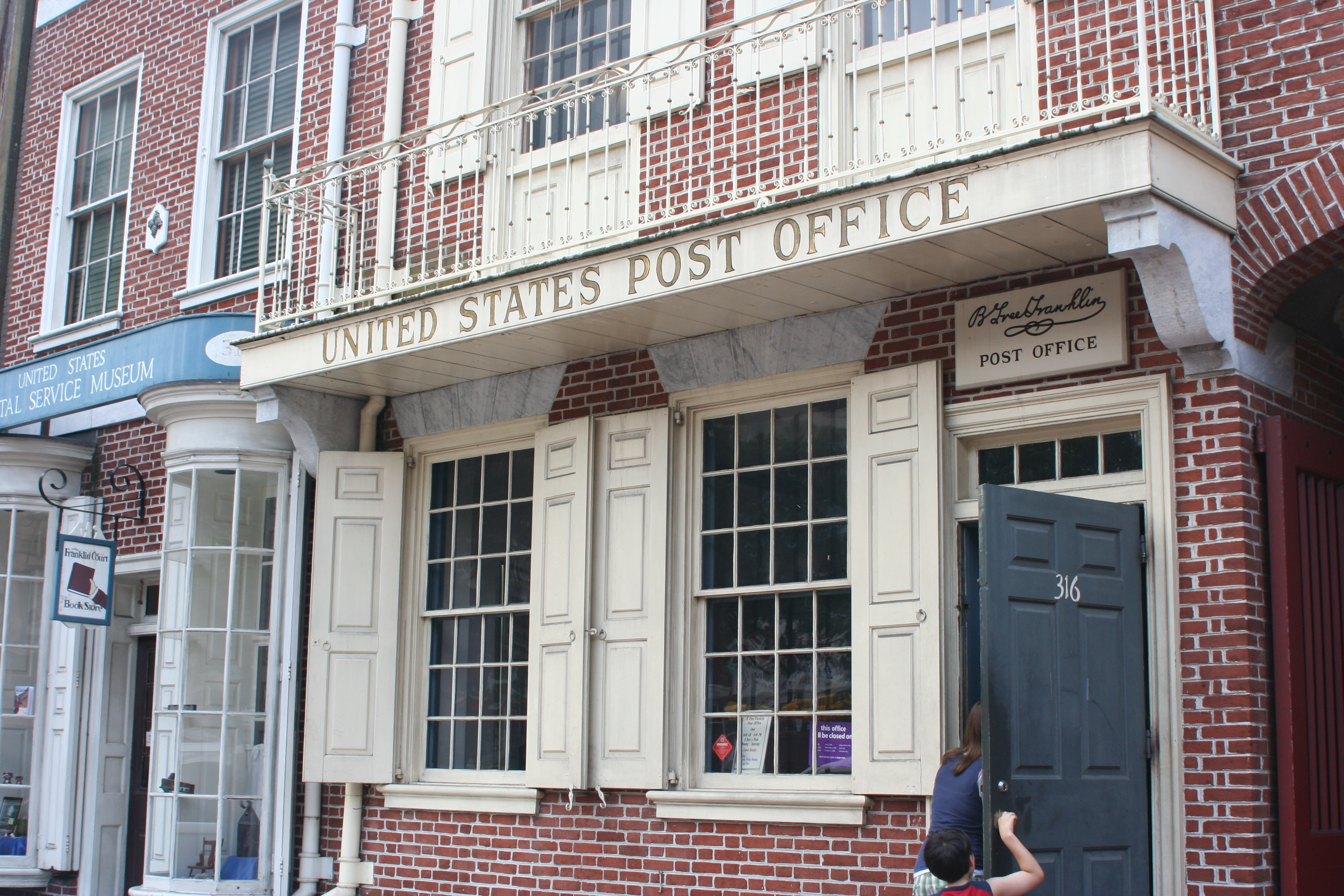
Benjamin Franklin Post Office in Philadelphia

In the American colonies, informal independently-run postal routes began in Boston as early as 1639, with Boston to New York City service starting in 1672. Courier service began between Montreal and Quebec City by 1693, and likely occurred earlier, as Pedro da Silva, a courier, had arrived more than 20 years before that. (This area of New France would join Britain’s other American colonies in 1763 as Quebec.)

Officially sanctioned mail service began in 1692 when King William III granted to an English nobleman a delivery "patent" that included the exclusive right to establish and collect a formal postal tax on official documents of all kinds. Years later, in 1765, taxation implemented through the mandatory purchase of stamps (embossed directly on documents or embossed on paper and affixed to them) was an issue that helped to spark the American Revolution. The tax was repealed a year later, and few were ever actually used in the colonies, but they were sold, including in Nova Scotia and the British Caribbean islands.

In the years leading up to the American Revolution, mail routes among the colonies existed along the few roads between Boston, New York, Philadelphia, Montreal, Trois Rivieres, and Quebec City. Halifax stationer Benjamin Leigh started postal service in Nova Scotia by 1754. The following year, the British post office inaugurated a monthly packet run from Britain to New York, an attempt to improve military communications. From New York, any available ships carried mail to port cities, including Halifax. In the middle 18th century, individuals like Benjamin Franklin and William Goddard were the colonial postmasters who managed the mails then, and were the general architects of a postal system that started out as an alternative to the Crown Post (the colonial mail system then) which became more distrusted as the American Revolution drew near. The postal system that Franklin and Goddard forged out of the American Revolution became the standard for the new U.S. Post Office and is a system whose basic designs are still used in the United States Postal Service today.

== Post offices and postmarks ==
Visualizing US expansion through post offices, 1700 to 1900

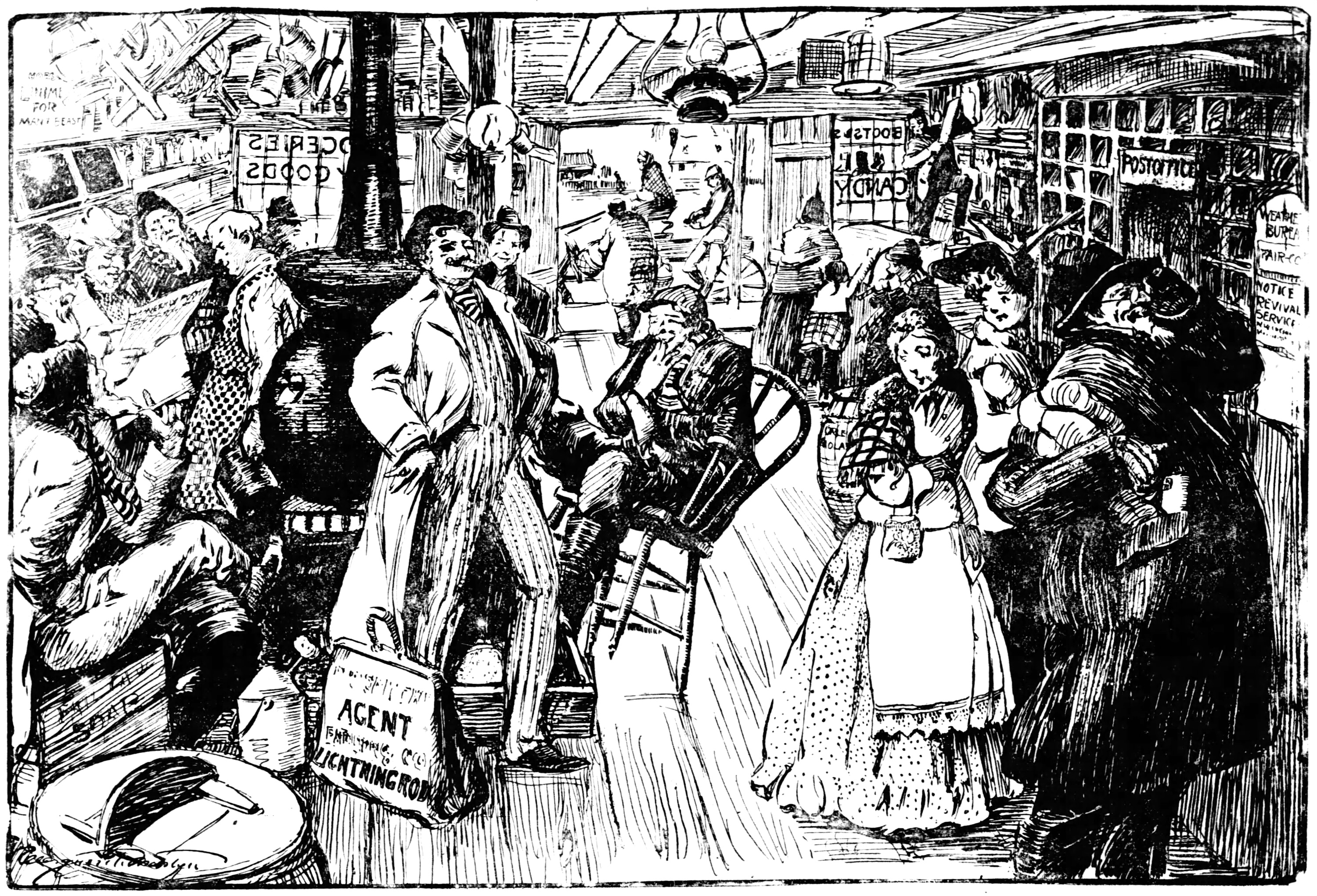
Fanciful drawing by Marguerite Martyn in the St. Louis Post-Dispatch of October 21, 1906, with, on the right, a rural post office in a general store

In 1775, when Benjamin Franklin was appointed the first Postmaster General, the U.S. Post Office was born. So important was the Postmaster General that in 1829 this position was included among those in the President's Cabinet. As America began to grow and new towns and villages began to appear, so too did the Post Office along with them. The dates and postmarks generated from these places often have provided the historian with a window into a given time and place. Each postmark is unique with its own name of state and town, in addition to its distinctive date.

Post offices along railroad lines and military posts have historical significance. Mail and postmarks from prisoner-of-war camps during the American Civil War, as well as from naval ships with U.S. post office aboard, have provided insights into U.S. history and are of interest to historians and collectors.

Between 1874 and 1976 post offices were categorized from first to fourth classes based on the amount of revenue they generated, with first being the highest.

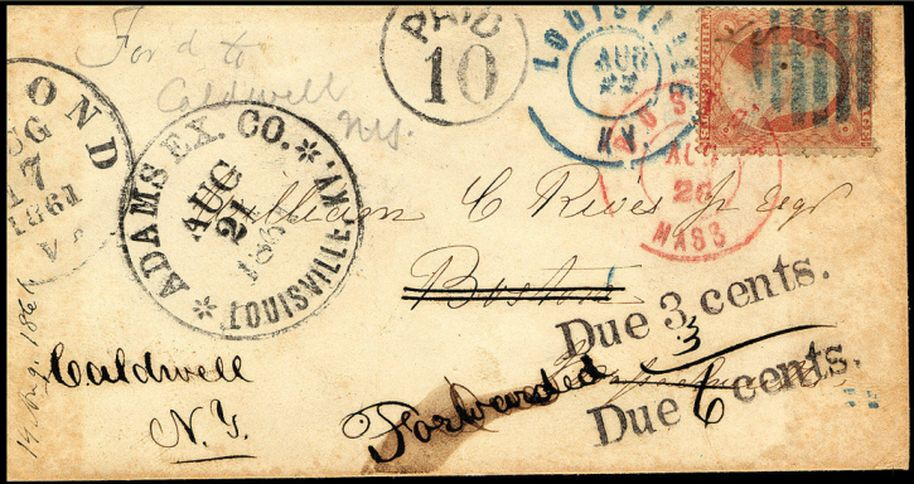
Multiple dates in 1861

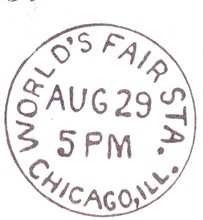
Aug. 29, 1893

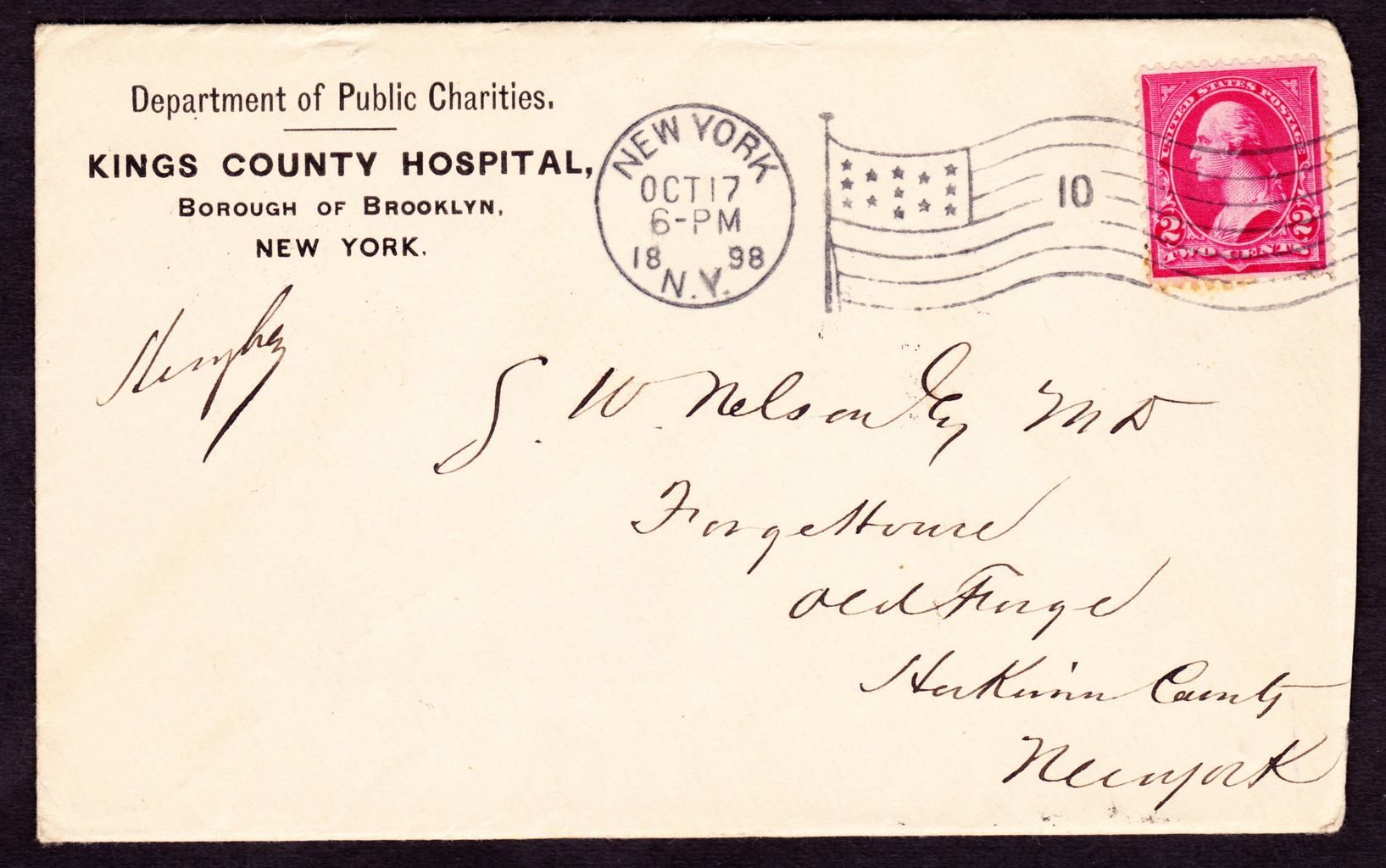
Oct. 17, 1898

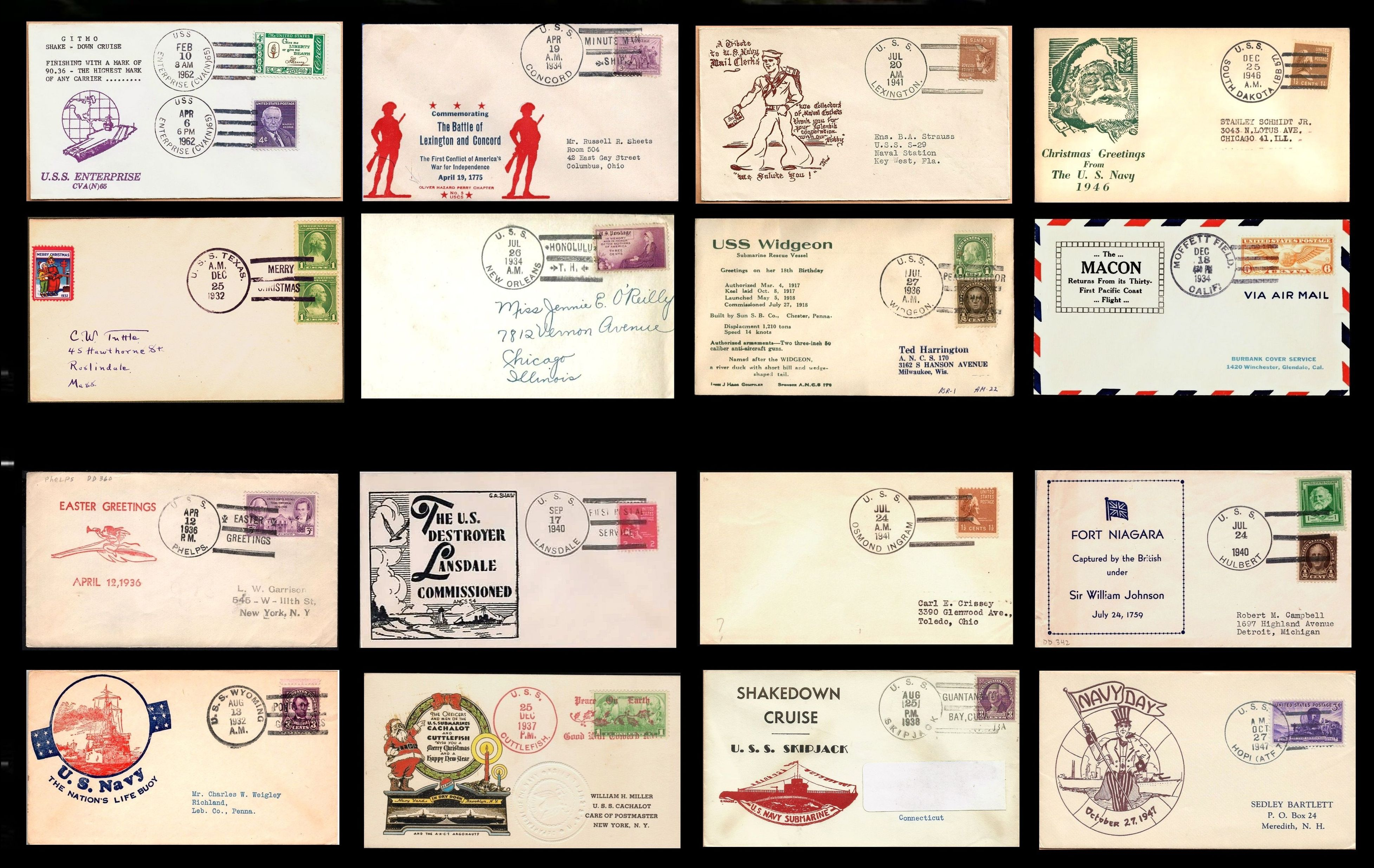
Selection of US Navy covers

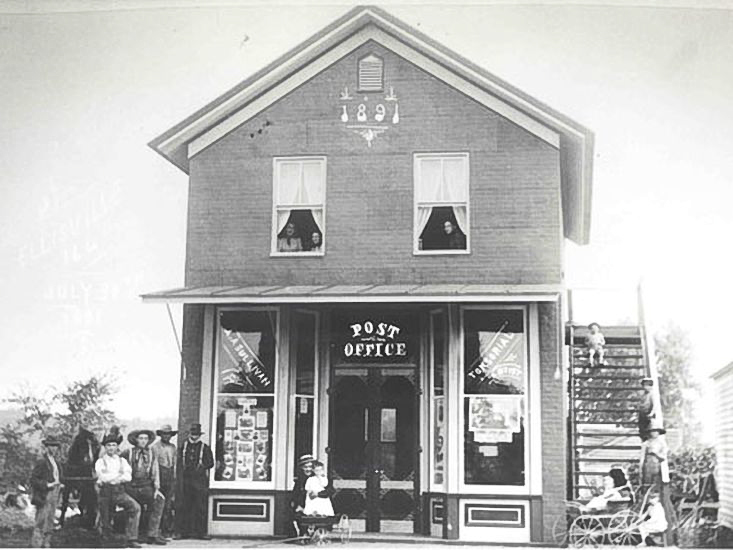
Ellisville Post Office, Illinois, 1891

== Mail before postage stamps ==
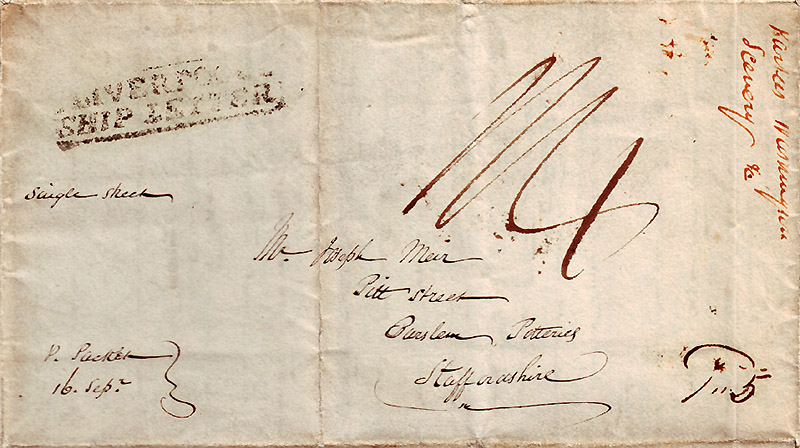
An 1832 stampless single sheet "Liverpool Ship Letter" pen franked "Paid 5" by a U.S. postal clerk in Philadelphia, Pennsylvania

Before the introduction of stamps, it was the recipient of mail—not the sender—who generally paid the cost of postage, giving the fee directly to the postman on delivery. The task of collecting money for letter after letter greatly slowed the postman on his route. Moreover, the addressee would at times refuse a piece of mail, which then had to be taken back to the post office (post office budgets always allowed for an appreciable volume of unpaid-for mail). Only occasionally did a sender pay delivery costs in advance, an arrangement that usually required a personal visit to the post office. To be sure, postmasters allowed some citizens to run charge accounts for their delivered and prepaid mail, but bookkeeping on these constituted another inefficiency.

Postage stamps revolutionized this process, leading to universal prepayment; but a precondition for their issue by a nation was the establishment of standardized rates for delivery throughout the country. If postal fees were to remain (as they were in many lands) a patchwork of many different jurisdictional rates, the use of stamps would only produce limited gains in efficiency, for postal clerks would still have to spend time calculating the rates on many letters: only then would senders know how much postage to put on them.

== Provisional issue stamps ==
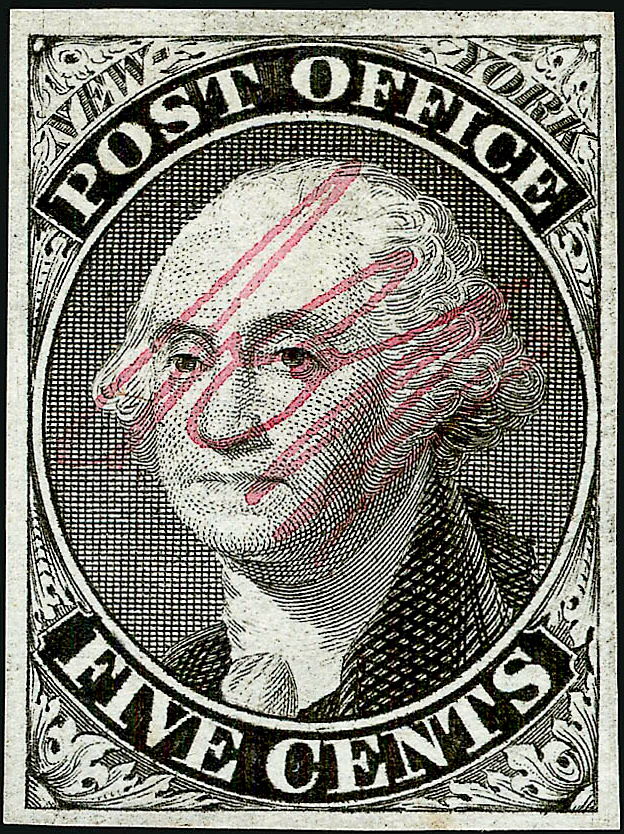
New York Postmaster's Provisional, 1845

The introduction of postage stamps in the UK in May 1840 was received with great interest in the United States (and around the world). Later that year, Daniel Webster rose in the U.S. Senate to recommend that the recent English postal reforms—standardized rates and the use of postage stamps—be adopted in America.

It would be private enterprise, however, that brought stamps to the U.S. On February 1, 1842, a new carrier service called "City Despatch Post" began operations in New York City, introducing the first adhesive postage stamp ever produced in the western hemisphere, which it required its clients to use for all mail. This stamp was a 3¢ issue bearing a rather amateurish drawing of George Washington, printed from line engraved plates in sheets of 42 images. The company had been founded by Henry Thomas Windsor, a London merchant who at the time was living in Hoboken, New Jersey. Alexander M. Greig was advertised as the post's "agent", and as a result, historians and philatelists have tended to refer to the firm simply as "Greig's City Despatch Post", making no mention of Windsor. In another innovation, the company placed mail-collection boxes around the city for the convenience of its customers.

A few months after its founding, the City Despatch Post was sold to the U.S. government, which renamed it the "United States City Despatch Post". The government began operation of this local post on August 16, 1842, under an Act of Congress of some years earlier that authorized local delivery. Greig, retained by the Post Office to run the service, kept the firm's original Washington stamp in use, but soon had its lettering altered to reflect the name change. In its revised form, this issue accordingly became the first postage stamp produced under the auspices of a government in the Western Hemisphere.

An Act of Congress of March 3, 1845 (effective July 1, 1845), established uniform (and mostly reduced) postal rates throughout the nation, with a uniform rate of five cents for distances under 300 miles (500 km) and ten cents for distances between 300 and 3,000 miles. However, Congress did not authorize the production of stamps for nationwide use until 1847; still, postmasters realized that standard rates now made it feasible to produce and sell "provisional" issues for prepayment of uniform postal fees, and printed these in bulk. Such provisionals included both prepaid envelopes and stamps, mostly of crude design, the New York Postmaster's Provisional being the only one of quality comparable to later stamps.

The provisional issues of Baltimore were notable for the reproduced signature of the city's postmaster—James M. Buchanan (1803–1876), a cousin to President James Buchanan. All provisional issues are rare, some inordinately so: at a Siegel Gallery auction in New York in March 2012, an example of the Millbury provisional fetched $400,000, while copies of the Alexandria and Annapolis provisionals each sold for $550,000. Eleven cities printed provisional stamps in 1845 and 1846:

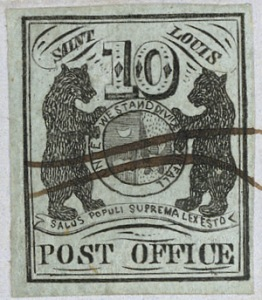
Provisional stamp issued in St. Louis, Missouri

- Alexandria, Virginia ("ALEXANDRIA POST OFFICE" in circle)
- Annapolis, Maryland (eagle in circle)
- Baltimore, Maryland (James Buchanan signature)
- Boscawen, New Hampshire ("PAID / 5 / CENTS")
- Brattleboro, Vermont (shaded box with postmaster initials inside)
- Lockport, New York ("LOCKPORT N.Y." in oval)
- Millbury, Massachusetts (woodcut of George Washington)
- New Haven, Connecticut ("POST OFFICE" in box, P.M. signature)
- New York, New York ("POST OFFICE" over Washington portrait)
- Providence, Rhode Island ("POST OFFICE / PROV. R.I." in shaded box)
- St. Louis, Missouri (St. Louis Bears, Missouri coat of arms)

(See also: A Gallery of U. S. Postmasters' Provisional Stamps, 1845-47.)

The 1845 Congressional act did, in fact, raise the rate on one significant class of mail: the so-called "drop letter"—i. e., a letter delivered from the same post office that collected it. Previously one cent, the drop letter rate became two cents.

== First national postage stamps ==
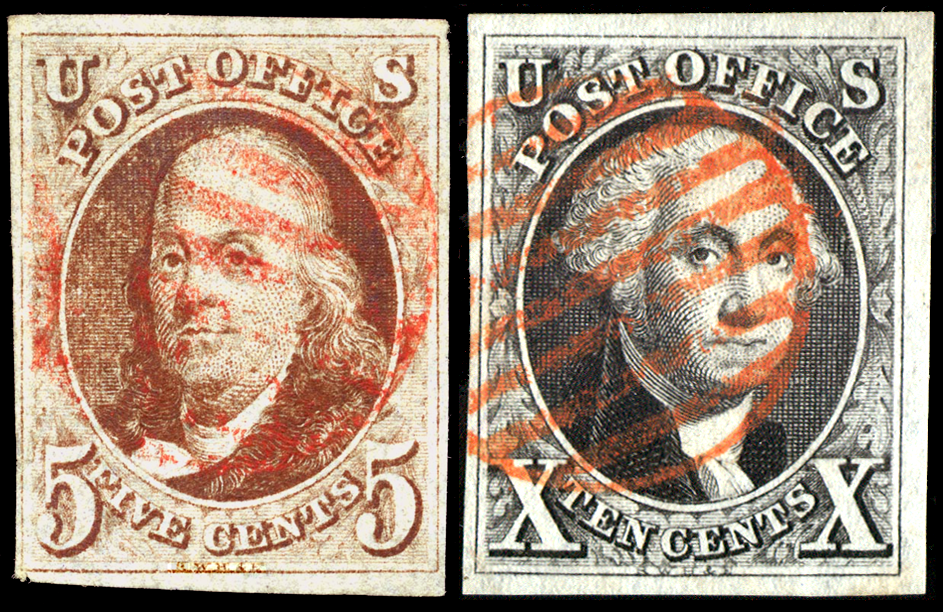
Benjamin Franklin — George Washington The First U.S. Postage Stamps, issued 1847. The first stamp issues were authorized by an act of Congress and approved on March 3, 1847. The earliest known use of the Franklin 5¢ is July 7, 1847, while the earliest known use of the Washington 10¢ is July 2, 1847. Remaining in postal circulation for only a few years, these issues were declared invalid for postage on July 1, 1851.

Congress finally provided for the issuance of stamps by passing an act on March 3, 1847, and the Postmaster-General immediately let a contract to the New York City engraving firm of Rawdon, Wright, Hatch, and Edson. The first stamp issue of the U.S. was offered for sale on July 1, 1847, in New York City, with Boston receiving stamps the following day and other cities thereafter. They consisted of an engraved 5-cent red brown stamp depicting Benjamin Franklin (the first postmaster of the U.S.), and a 10-cent value in black with George Washington. Like all U.S. stamps until 1857, they were imperforate.

The 5-cent stamp paid for a letter weighing less than 1/2 ounce and traveling up to 300 miles, the 10-cent stamp for deliveries to locations greater than 300 miles, or, twice the weight deliverable for the 5-cent stamp. Each stamp was hand engraved in what is believed to be steel, and laid out in sheets of 200 stamps. The 5-cent stamp is often found today with very poor impressions because the type of ink used contained small pieces of quartz that wore down the steel plates used to print the stamp. On the other hand, most 10-cent stamps are of strong impressions.

The use of stamps was optional: letters could still be sent requiring payment of postage on delivery. Indeed, the post office did not issue any 2-cent value for prepaying drop letters in 1847, and these continued to be handled as they had been. Nevertheless, many Americans took up using stamps; about 3,700,000 of the 5¢ and about 865,000 of the 10¢ were sold, and enough of those have survived to ensure a ready supply for collectors, although the demand is such that a very fine 5¢ sells for around $500 as of 2020, and the 10¢ in very fine condition, face-free stamped cancellation, with four well-spaced borders, sells for $1,500 or more in used form. Unused stamps are much scarcer, fetching around $3,000 and $20,000 respectively, if in very fine condition.

The post office had become so efficient by 1851 that Congress was able to reduce the common rate to three cents (which remained unchanged for over thirty years), necessitating a new issue of stamps. Moreover, the common rate now applied to letters carried up to 3000 miles. This rate, however, only applied to prepaid mail: a letter sent without a stamp still cost the recipient five cents—clear evidence that Congress envisioned making stamp use mandatory in the future (it did so in 1855). The 1-cent drop-letter rate was also restored, and Post Office plans did not at first include a stamp for it; later, however, an essay for a 6-cent Franklin double-weight stamp was converted into a drop-letter value. Along with this 1¢ stamp, the post office initially issued only two additional denominations in the series of 1851: 3¢ and 12¢, the three stamps going on sale that July and August. Since the 1847 stamps no longer conformed to any postal rate, they were declared invalid after a short period during which the public could exchange old stamps for new ones. Within a few years the Post Office found that stamps in the old denominations were needed after all, and so, added a 10¢ value to the series in 1855, followed by a 5¢ stamp the following year. The full series included a 1¢ profile of Franklin in blue, a 3¢ profile of Washington in red brown, a 5¢ portrait of Thomas Jefferson, and portraits of Washington for 10¢ green and 12¢ black values. The 1¢ stamp achieved notoriety, at least among philatelists, because production problems (the stamp design was too tall for the space provided) led to a welter of plate modifications done in piecemeal fashion, and there are no fewer than seven major varieties, ranging in price from $100 to $200,000 (the latter for the only stamp of the 200 images on the first plate that displays the design's top and bottom ornamentation complete).

First national postage stamps

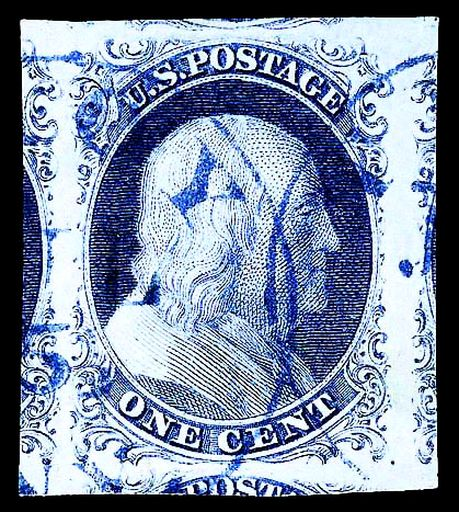
Benjamin Franklin Issue of 1851

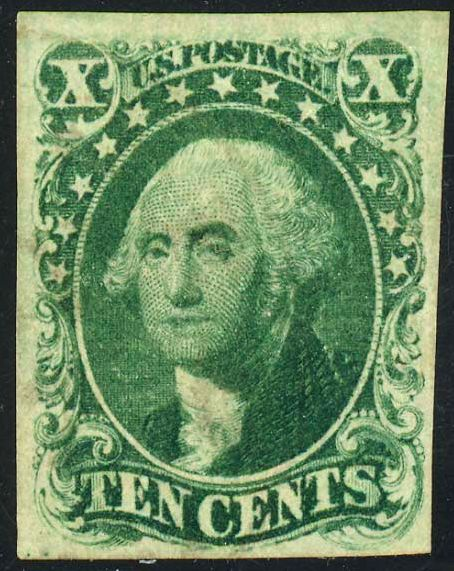
George Washington Issue of 1855

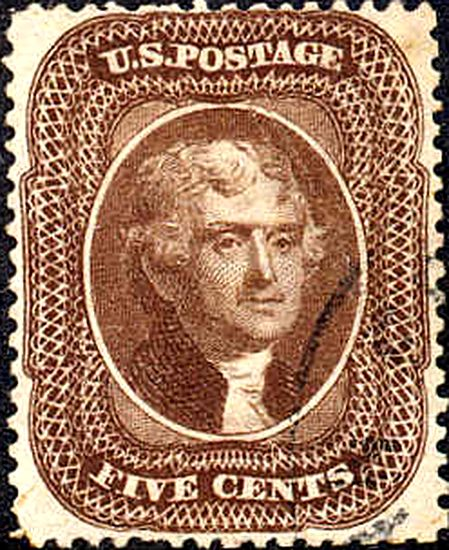
Thomas Jefferson Issue of 1857

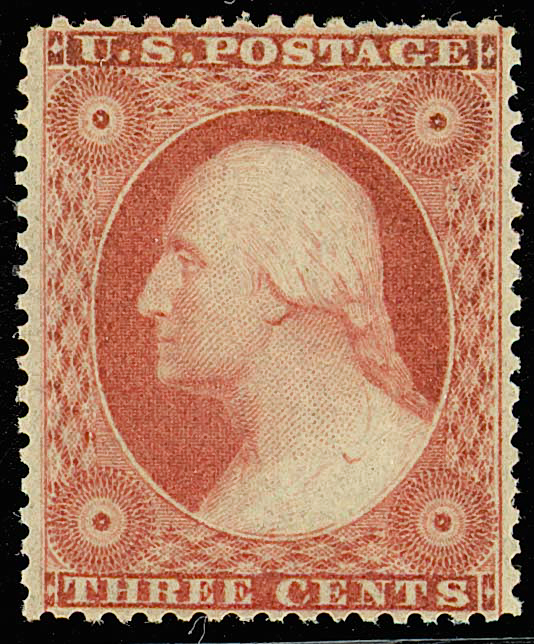
George Washington Issue of 1857

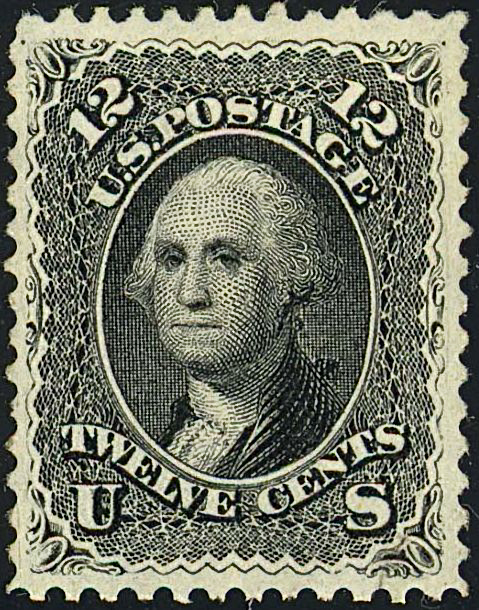
George Washington Issue of 1857

1857 saw the introduction of perforation, and in 1860 24¢, 30¢ and 90¢ values (with still more images of Washington and Franklin) were issued for the first time. These higher denominations, especially the 90¢ value, were available for such a short time (a little over a year) that they had virtually no chance of being used. The 90¢ stamp used is a very rare item, and so frequently forged that authorities counsel collectors to shun cancelled copies that lack expert certification.

In February 1861, a congressional act directed that "cards, blank or printed ... shall also be deemed mailable matter, and charged with postage at the rate of one cent an ounce." Private companies soon began issuing post cards, printed with a rectangle in the top right corner where the stamp was to be affixed. (The Post Office would not produce pre-stamped "postal cards" for another dozen years.)

The issue was declared invalid for postage in May 1861, as the Confederate States had supplies of them. Therefore, stamps used after that date usually have the marking "OLD STAMPS/NOT RECOGNIZED" on the cover.

== Issues of the Civil War era ==
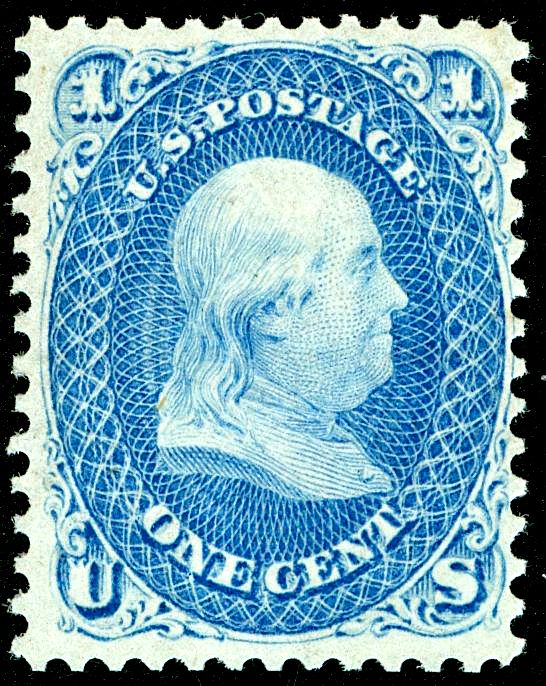
Benjamin Franklin. Issue of 1861

The outbreak of the American Civil War threw the postal system into turmoil. On April 13, 1861 (the day after the firing on Fort Sumter), John H. Reagan, postmaster-general of the Confederate States of America, ordered local postmasters to return their U.S. stamps to Washington, D.C. (although it is unlikely that many did so), while in May the Union decided to withdraw and invalidate all existing U.S. stamps, and to issue new stamps. Confederate post offices were left without legitimate stamps for several months, and while many reverted to the old system of cash payment at the post office, over 100 post offices across the South came up with their own provisional issues. Many of these are quite rare. Eventually, the Confederate government issued its own stamps; see stamps and postal history of the Confederate States.

In the North, the new stamp designs became available in August, and old stamps were accepted in exchange, with different deadlines for replacement set for different regions of the country, first ranging from September 10 to November 1, later modified to November 1 to January 1, 1862. The whole process was very confusing to the public, and there are a number of covers from 1862 and later with 1857 stamps and bearing the marking "OLD STAMPS NOT RECOGNIZED".

The 1861 stamps had in common the letters "U S" in their design. To make them differentiable from the older stamps at a glance, all were required to have their values expressed in Arabic numerals (in the previous series, Arabic numerals had appeared only on the 30¢ stamp). The original issue included all the denominations offered in the previous series: 1¢, 3¢, 5¢, 10¢, 12¢, 24¢, 30¢ and 90¢ stamps. Numerals apart, several of these are superficially similar to their earlier counterparts—particularly because Franklin, Washington and Jefferson still appear on the same denominations as previously.

A 2¢ stamp in black featuring Andrew Jackson was issued in 1863 and is now known to collectors as the "Black Jack". A black 15¢ stamp depicting the recently assassinated Abraham Lincoln was issued in 1866, and is generally considered part of the same series. While it was not officially described as such, and the 15¢ value was chosen to cover newly established fee for registered letters, some philatelists consider this to be the first memorial stamp ever issued.

The war greatly increased the amount of mail in the North; ultimately about 1,750,000,000 copies of the 3¢ stamp were printed, and a great many have survived to the present day, typically selling for 2–3 dollars apiece. Most are rose-colored; pink versions are much rarer and quite expensive, especially the "pigeon blood pink".

The stamps of the 1861 series, unlike those of the two previous issues, remained valid for postage after they had been superseded—as has every subsequent United States stamp.

=== Pony Express ===
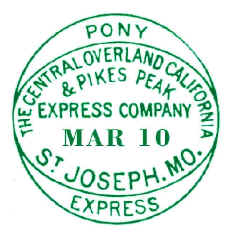
Pony Express compound oval Postmark, one of many types found on the covers of Pony Express mail

In 1860, the U.S. Post Office incorporated the services of the Pony Express to get mail to and from San Francisco, an important undertaking with the outbreak of the Civil War, as a communication link between Union forces and San Francisco and the West Coast was badly needed. The Pony Express Trail from St. Joseph, Missouri, to Sacramento, California, was 1,840 miles long. Upon arrival in Sacramento, the U.S. mail was placed on a steamer and continued down the Sacramento River to San Francisco for a total of 1,966 miles. The Pony Express was a short-lived enterprise, remaining in operation for only 18 months. Consequently, there is little surviving Pony Express mail today, only 250 examples known in existence.

=== Encased postage stamps ===
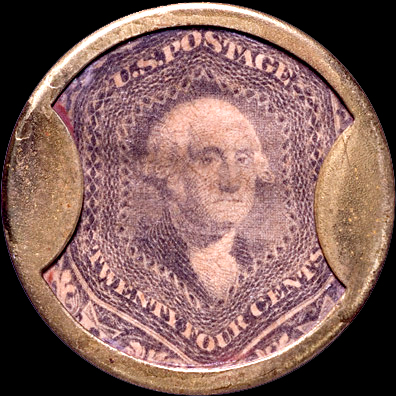

Widespread hoarding of coins during the Civil War created a shortage, prompting the use of stamps for currency. To be sure, the fragility of stamps made them unsuitable for hand-to-hand circulation, and to solve this problem, John Gault invented the encased postage stamp in 1862. A normal U. S. stamp was wrapped around a circular cardboard disc and then placed inside a coin-like circular brass jacket. A transparent mica window in the jacket allowed the face of the stamp to be seen. All eight denominations available in 1861–62, ranging from 1 cent to 90 cents, were offered in encased versions. Raised lettering on the metal backs of the jackets often advertised the goods or services of business firms; these included the Aerated Bread Company; Ayer's Sarsaparilla and Cathartic Pills; Burnett's Cocoaine; Sands Ale; Drake's Plantation Bitters; Buhl & Co. Hats and Furs; Lord & Taylor; Tremont House, Chicago; Joseph L. Bates Fancy Goods; White the Hatter, New York City; and Ellis McAlpin & Co. Dry Goods, Cincinnati. (See also: Fractional currency.)

== Grills ==
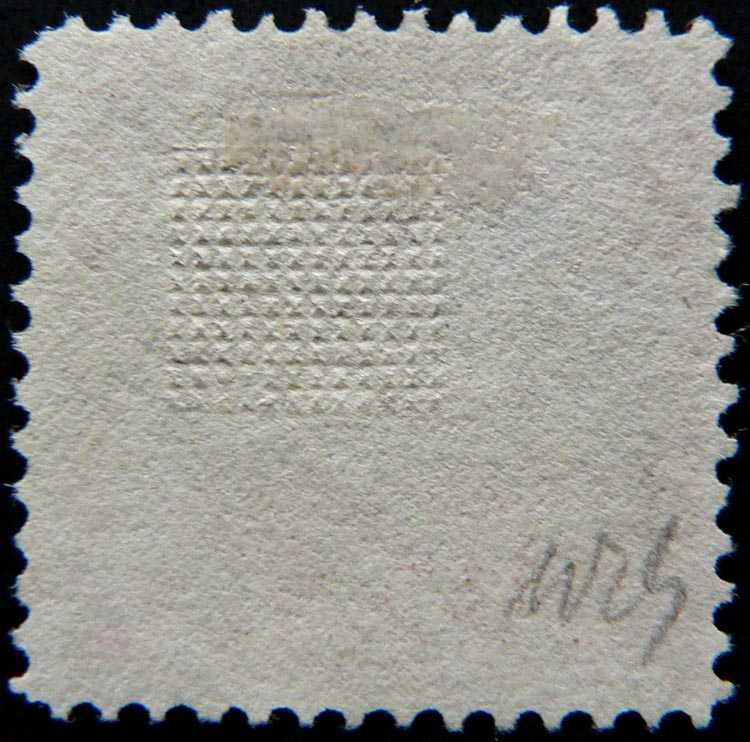
"G" grill on an 1869 issue

During the 1860s, the postal authorities became concerned about postage stamp reuse. While there is little evidence that this occurred frequently, many post offices had never received any canceling devices. Instead, they improvised a canceling process by scribbling on the stamp with an ink pen ("pen cancellation"), or whittling designs in pieces of cork, sometimes very creatively ("fancy cancels"), to mark the stamps. However, since poor-quality ink could be washed from the stamp, this method would only have been moderately successful. A number of inventors patented various ideas to attempt to solve the problem.

The Post Office eventually adopted the grill, a device consisting of a pattern of tiny pyramidal bumps that would emboss the stamp, breaking up the fibers so that the ink would soak in more deeply, and thus be difficult to clean off. While the patent survives (No. 70,147), much of the actual process of grilling was not well documented, and there has been considerable research trying to recreate what happened and when. Study of the stamps shows that there were eleven types of grill in use, distinguished by size and shape (philatelists have labeled them with letters A-J and Z), and that the practice started sometime in 1867 and was gradually abandoned after 1871. A number of grilled stamps are among the great rarities of US philately. The United States 1¢ Z grill was long thought to be the rarest of all U.S. stamps, with only two known to exist. In 1961, however, it was discovered that the 15¢ stamp of the same series also existed in a Z grill version; this stamp is just as rare as the 1¢, for only two examples of the 15¢ Z grill are known. Rarer still may be the 30¢ stamp with the I Grill, the existence of which was discovered only recently: as of October 2011, only one copy is known.

== 1869 ==
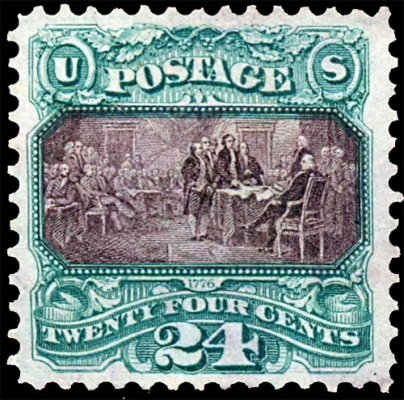
Declaration of Independence

In 1868, the Post Office contracted with the National Bank Note Company to produce new stamps with a variety of designs. These came out in 1869, and were notable for the variety of their subjects; the 2¢ depicted a Pony Express rider, the 3¢ a locomotive, the 12¢ the steamship Adriatic, the 15¢ the landing of Christopher Columbus, and the 24¢ the signing of the Declaration of Independence.

Other innovations in what has become known as the 1869 Pictorial Issue included the first use of two-color printing on U.S. stamps, and as a consequence the first invert errors. Although popular with collectors today, the unconventional stamps were not very popular among a population that was accustomed to postage that bore classic portrayals of Washington, Franklin and other forefathers.

== Bank notes ==
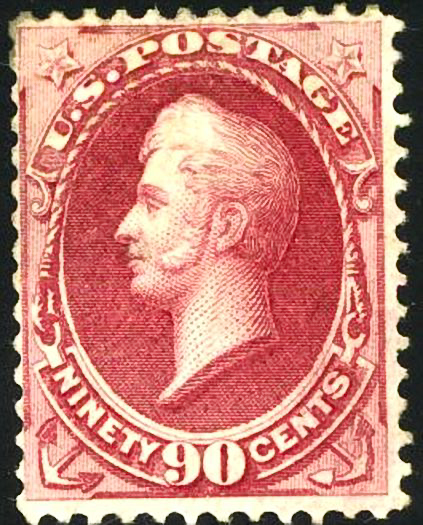
Oliver Hazard Perry National Bank Note 1870 issue

The postage stamps issued in the 1870s and 1880s are collectively known as the "Bank Notes" because they were produced by the National Bank Note Company, the Continental Bank Note Company, then the American Bank Note Company. After the 1869 fiasco with pictorial stamp issues, the new Postmaster-General decided to base a series of stamps on the "heads, in profile, of distinguished deceased Americans" using "marble busts of acknowledged excellence" as models. George Washington was returned to the normal-letter-rate stamp: he had played that role in the issues of 1851 and 1861 and would continue to do so in every subsequent definitive set until the Presidential Series of 1938. But the large banknotes did not represent a total retreat to past practices, for the range of celebrated Americans was widened beyond Franklin and various presidents to include notables such as Henry Clay and Oliver Hazard Perry. Moreover, while images of statesmen had provided the only pictorial content of pre-1869 issues, the large banknotes did not entirely exclude other representative images. Two denominations of the series accompanied their portraits with iconographic images appropriate to the statesmen they honored: rifles, a cannon and cannonballs appeared in the bottom corners of the 24-cent issue devoted to General Winfield Scott, while the 90-cent stamp framed Admiral Oliver Perry within a nautically hitched oval of rope and included anchors in the bottom corners of its design. National first printed these, then in 1873 Continental received the contract—and the plates that National used. Continental added secret marks to the plates of the lower values, distinguishing them from the previous issues. The American Bank Note Company acquired Continental in 1879 and took over the contract, printing similar designs on softer papers and with some color changes. Major redesigning, however, came only in 1890, when the American Bank Note Company issued a new series in which stamp-size was reduced by about 10% (the so-called "Small Bank Notes").

In 1873, the Post Office began producing a pre-stamped post card. One side was printed with a Liberty-head one-cent stamp design, along with the words "United States Postal Card" and three blank lines provided for the mailing address. Six years later, it introduced a series of seven Postage Due stamps in denominations ranging from 1¢ to 50¢, all printed in the same brownish-red color and conforming to the same uniform and highly utilitarian design, with their denominations rendered in numerals much larger than those found on definitive stamps. The design remained unchanged until 1894, and only four different postage-due designs have appeared to date.

In 1883, the first-class letter rate was reduced from 3¢ to 2¢, prompting a redesign of the existing 3¢ green Washington stamp, which now became a 2¢ brown issue.

=== Special Delivery ===
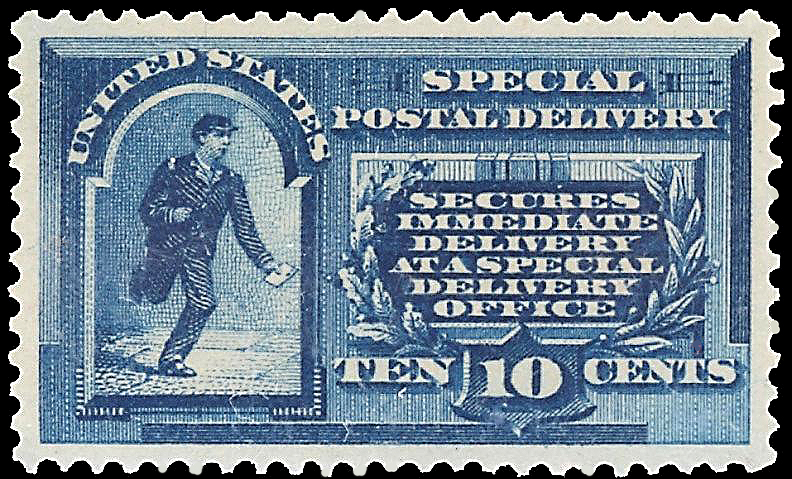
First Special Delivery stamp, 1885

In 1885 the Post Office established a Special Delivery service, issuing a ten-cent stamp depicting a running messenger, along with the wording "secures immediate delivery at a special delivery office." Initially, only 555 such offices existed but the following year all U. S. Post Offices were obliged to provide the service—an extension not, however, reflected on the Special Delivery stamp until 1888, when the words "at any post office" appeared on its reprint. (On stamps of future years, the messenger would be provided the technological enhancements of a bicycle [1902] a motorcycle [1922] and a truck [1925]. Although the last new U.S. Special Delivery stamp appeared issued in 1971, the service was continued until 1997, by which time it had largely been supplanted by Priority Mail delivery, introduced in 1989.) The 1885 Special Delivery issue was the first U.S. postage stamp designed in the double-width format. Eight years later, this shape would be chosen for the Columbian Exposition commemoratives, as it offered appropriate space for historical tableaux. The double-width layout would subsequently be employed in many United States Commemoratives.

== Columbian issue ==
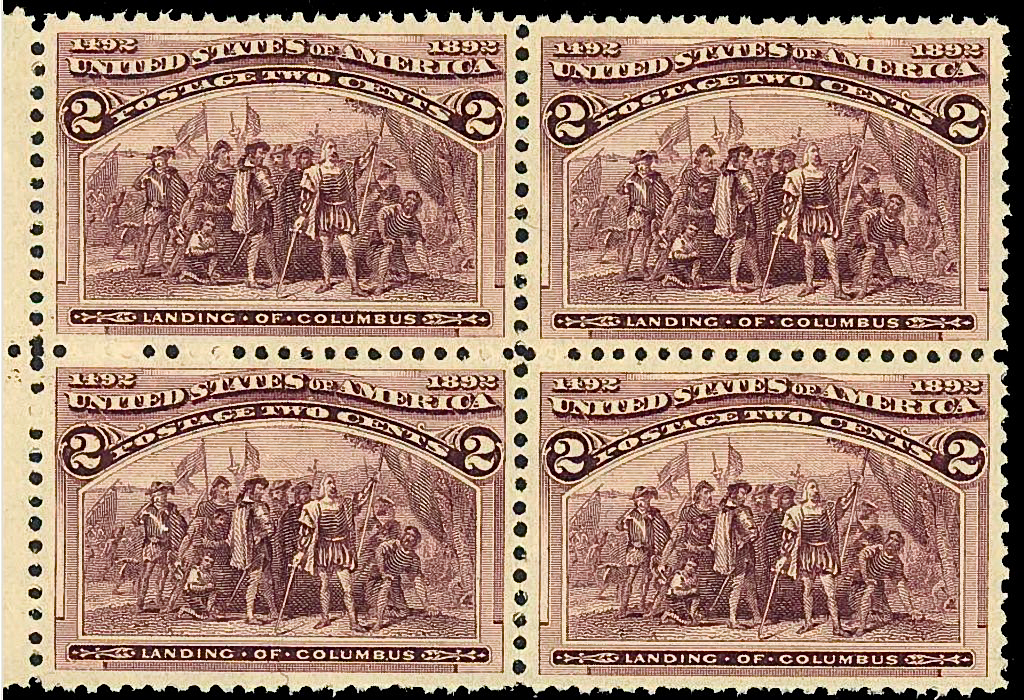
Landing of Christopher Columbus Issue of 1893

The World Columbian Exposition of 1893 commemorated the 400th anniversary of the landing of Christopher Columbus in the Americas. The Post Office got in on the act, issuing a series of 16 stamps depicting Columbus and episodes in his career, ranging in value from 1¢ to $5 (a princely sum in those days). They are often considered the first commemorative stamps issued by any country.

The stamps were interesting and attractive, designed to appeal to not only postage stamps collectors but to historians, artists and of course the general public who bought them in record numbers because of the fanfare of the Columbian Exposition of the World's Fair of 1892 in Chicago, Illinois.

They were quite successful (a great contrast to the pictorials of 1869), with lines spilling out of the nation's post offices to buy the stamps. They are prized by collectors today with the $5 denomination, for example, selling for between $1,500 to $12,500 or more, depending upon the condition of the stamp being sold.

Another release in connection with the Columbian series was a reprint of the 1888 Special Delivery stamp, now colored orange (reportedly, to prevent postal clerks from confusing it with the 1¢ Columbian). After sales of the series ceased, the Special Delivery stamp reappeared in its original blue.

== Bureau issues ==
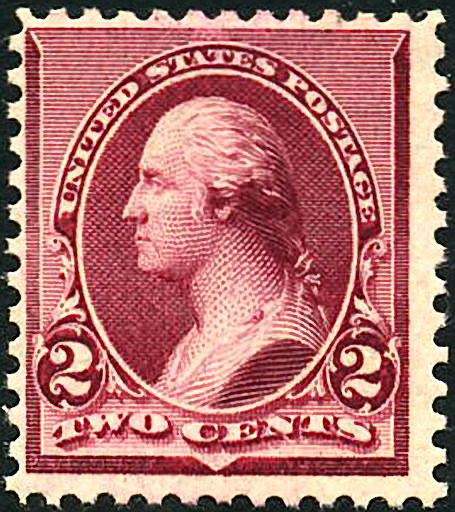
Original 1890 George Washington Issue without the corner triangles

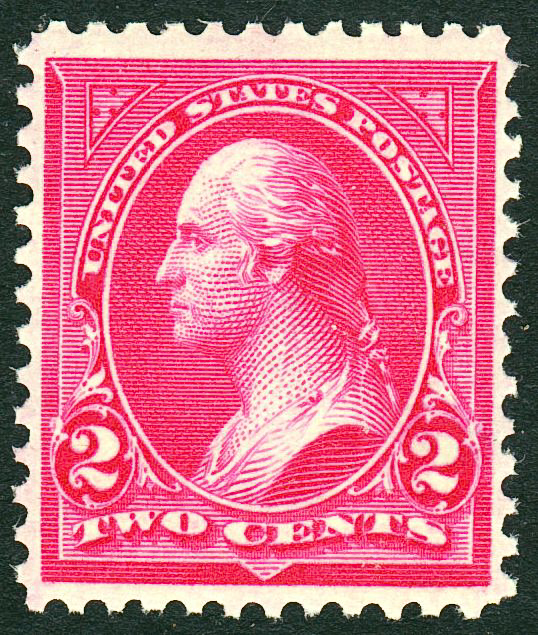
Washington 2-cent Bureau issue clearly showing the triangles in the upper corners

Also during 1893, the Bureau of Engraving and Printing competed for the postage stamp printing contract, and won it on the first try. For the postage issues of the 1894 series, the Bureau took over the plates of the 1890 small banknote series but modified them by adding triangles to the upper corners of the designs. Three new designs were needed, because the Post Office elected to add $1, $2 and $5 stamps to the series (previously, the top value of any definitive issue had been 90¢). On many of the 1894 stamps, perforations are of notably poor quality, but the Bureau would soon make technical improvements. In 1895 counterfeits of the 2¢ value were discovered, which prompted the BEP to begin printing stamps on watermarked paper for the first time in U.S. postal history. The watermarks imbedded the logo U S P S into the paper in double-lined letters. The Bureau's definitive issues of the 1890s consisted of 13 different denominations ranging from 1 cent to 5 dollars, and may be differentiated by the presence or absence of this watermark, which would appear on all U. S. Postage stamps between 1895 and 1910. The final issue of 1898 altered the colors of many denominations to bring the series into conformity with the recommendations of the Universal Postal Union (an international body charged with facilitating the course of transnational mail). The aim was to ensure that in all its member nations, stamps for given classes of mail would appear in the same colors. Accordingly, U.S. 1¢ stamps (postcards) were now green and 5¢ stamps (international mail) were now blue, while 2¢ stamps remained red. As a result, it was also necessary to replace the blue and green on higher values with other colors. U.S. postage continued to reflect this color-coding quite strictly until the mid-1930s, continuing also in the invariable use of purple for 3¢ stamps.

== Start of the 20th century ==
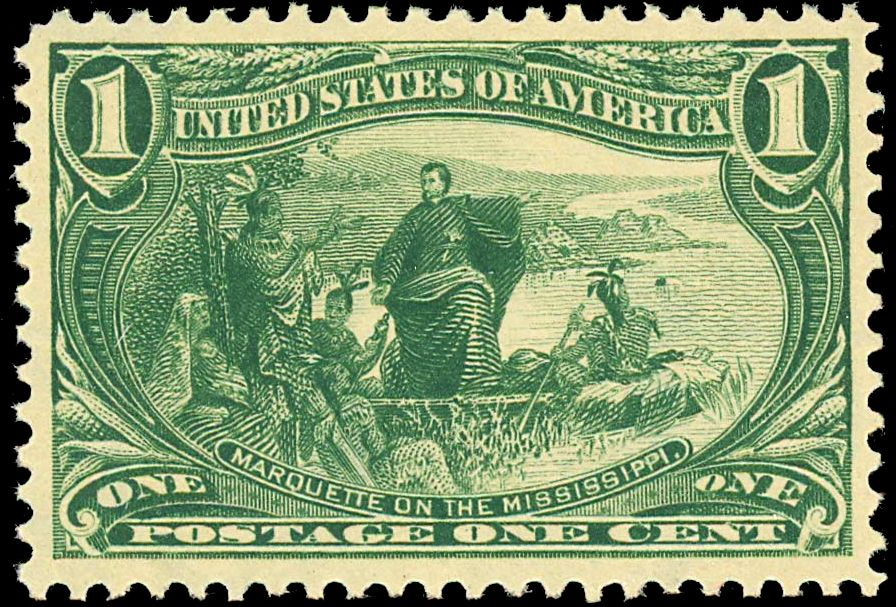
Trans Mississippi Issue, 1898-1c

In 1898, the Trans-Mississippi Exposition opened in Omaha, Nebraska, and the Post Office was ready with the Trans-Mississippi Issue. The nine stamps were originally to be two-toned, with black vignettes surrounded by colored frames, but the BEP, its resources overtaxed by the needs of the Spanish–American War, simplified the printing process, issuing the stamps in single colors. They were received favorably, though with less excitement than the Columbians; but like the Columbians, they are today prized by collectors, and many consider the $1 "Western Cattle in Storm" the most attractive of all U.S. stamps.

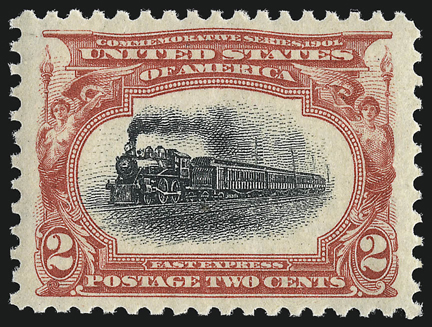
Pan-American Issue, 1901-2c

Collectors, still smarting from the expense of the Columbian stamps, objected that inclusion of $1 and $2 issues in the Trans-Mississippi series presented them with an undue financial hardship. Accordingly, the next stamp series commemorating a prominent exposition, the Pan-American Exposition held in Buffalo, New York in 1901, was considerably less costly, consisting of only six stamps ranging from in value 1¢ to 10¢. The result, paradoxically, was a substantial increase in Post Office profits; for, while the higher valued Columbians and Trans-Mississippis had sold only about 20,000 copies apiece, the public bought well over five million of every Pan-American denomination. In the Pan-American series the Post Office realized the plan for two-toned stamps that it had been obliged to abandon during the production of the Trans-Mississippi issue. Upside-down placement of some sheets during the two-stage printing process resulted in the so-called Pan-American invert errors on rare copies of the 1¢, 2¢ and 4¢ stamps.

== Definitive issues of 1902–1903 ==
The definitive stamps issued by the U.S. Post Office in 1902–1903 were markedly different in their overall designs from the regular definitive stamps released over the previous several decades. Among the prominent departures from tradition in these designs was that the names of the subjects were printed out, along with their years of birth and death. (Printed names and birth and death dates are more typically a feature of Commemorative stamps.) Unlike any definitive stamps ever issued before, the 1902–03 issues also had ornate sculptural frame work redolent of Beaux-Arts architecture about the portrait, often including allegorical figures of different sorts, with several different types of print used to denote the country, denominations and names of the subjects. This series of postage stamps were the first definitive issues to be entirely designed and printed by the Bureau of Engraving and Printing, and their Baroque revival style is much akin to that of the Pan-American commemoratives the Bureau had issued in 1901. There are fourteen denominations ranging from 1-cent to 5-dollars. The 2-cent George Washington stamp appeared with two different designs (the original version was poorly received) while each of the other values has its own individual design. This was the first U.S. definitive series to include the image of a woman: Martha Washington, who appeared on the 8-cent stamp.

Selected Issues

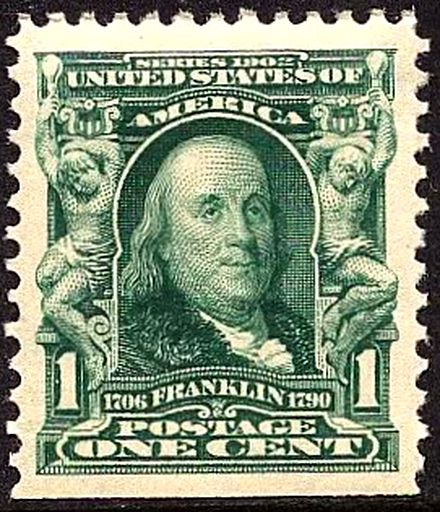
Franklin

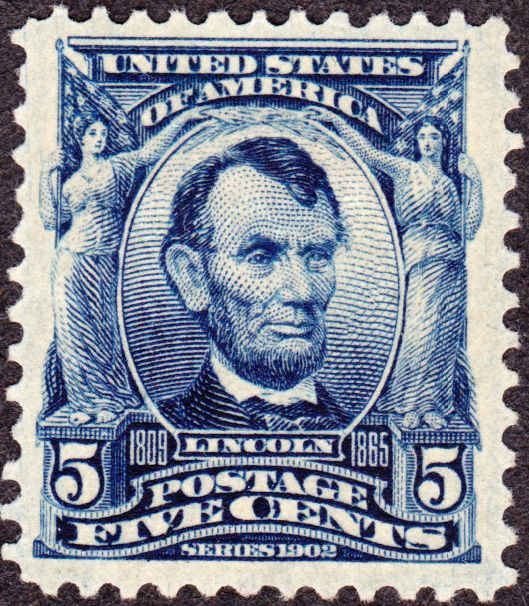
Lincoln

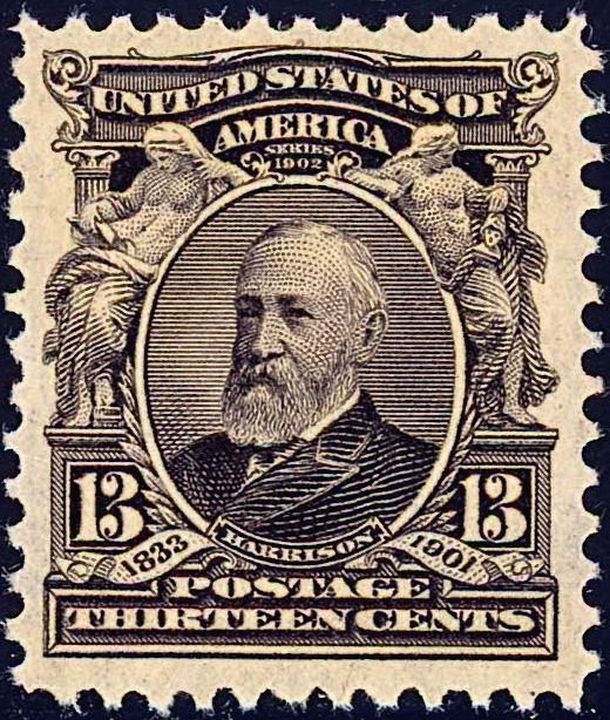
Harrison

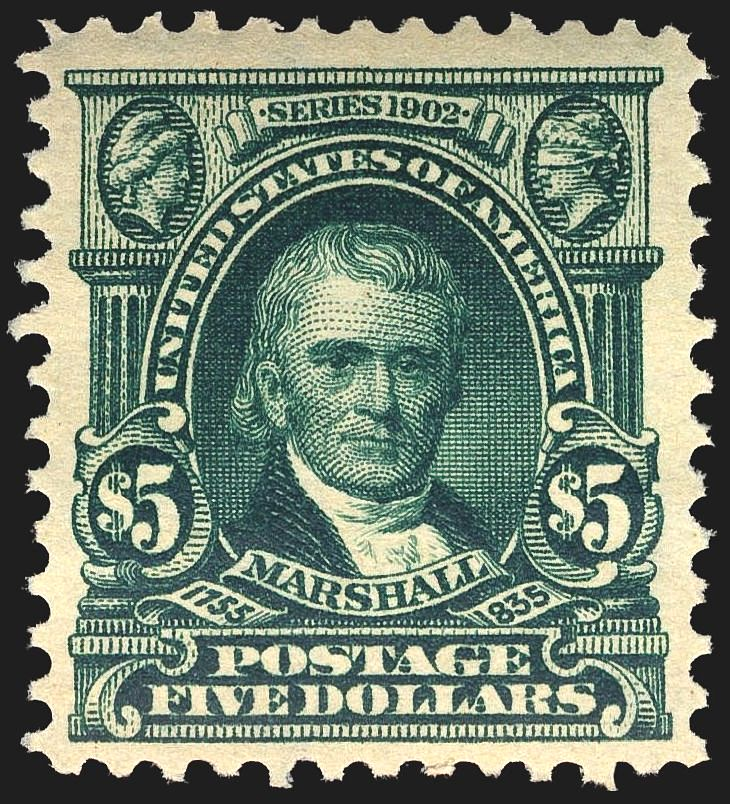
Marshall

== Commemorative issues, 1904–1907 ==
In these years, the postal service continued to produce commemorative sets in conjunction with important national expositions. The Louisiana Purchase Exposition in St. Louis, Missouri, in 1904 prompted a set of five stamps, while a trio of stamps commemorated the Jamestown Exposition, held in Norfolk, Virginia, in 1907.

== Washington-Franklin era ==
1908 saw the beginning of the long-running Washington-Franklin series of stamps. Although there were only two central images, a profile of Washington and one of Franklin, many subtle variants appeared over the years; for the Post Office experimented with half-a-dozen different perforation sizes, two kinds of watermarking, three printing methods, and large numbers of values, all adding to several hundred distinct types identified by collectors. Some are quite rare, but many are extremely common; this was the era of the postcard craze, and almost every antique shop in the U.S. will have some postcards with green 1¢ or red 2¢ stamps from this series. In 1910 the Post Office began phasing out the double-lined watermark, replacing it by the same U S P S logo in smaller single-line letters. Watermarks were discontinued entirely in 1916.

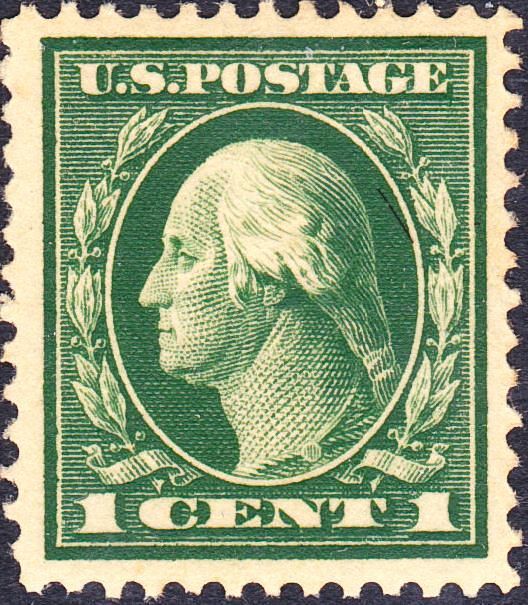
Washington issue of 1912

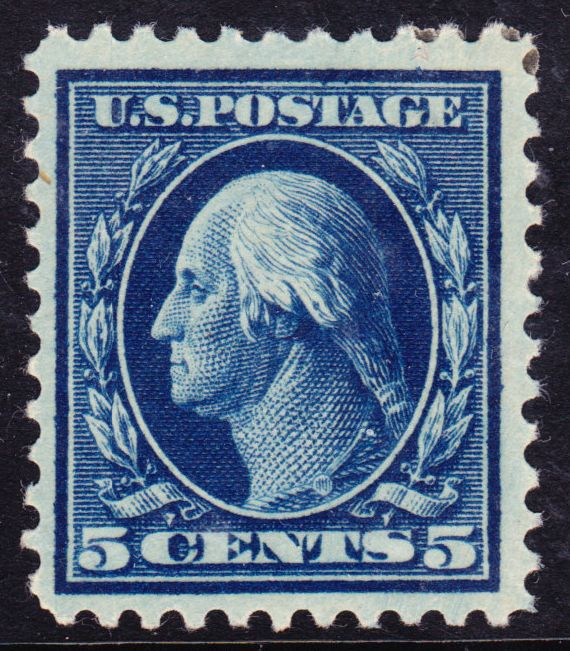
Washington issue of 1917

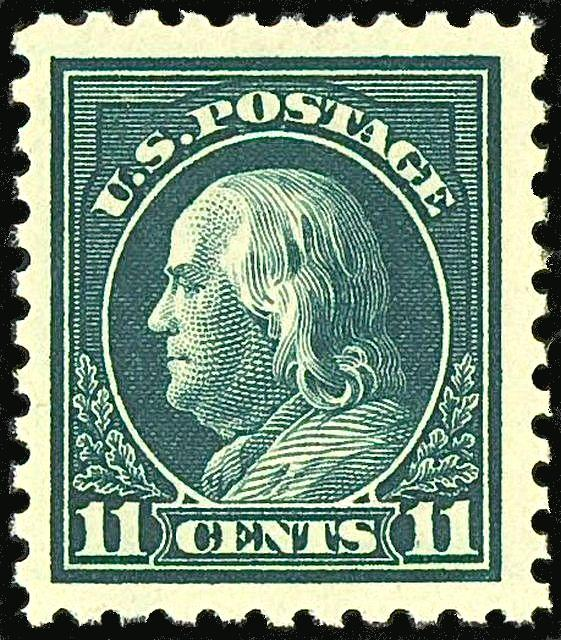
Franklin issue of 1915

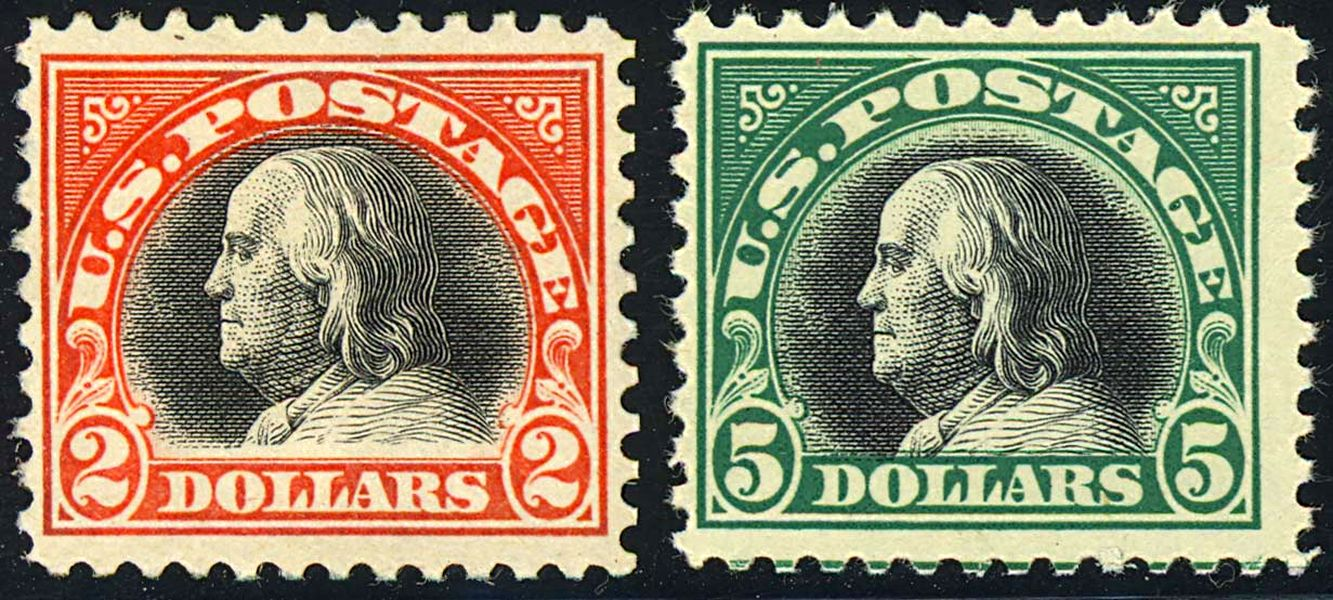
Franklin (The Big Bens) issue of 1918

Toward the beginning of the Washington-Franklin era, in 1909, the Post Office issued its first individual commemorative stamps—three single 2¢ issues honoring, respectively, the Lincoln Centennial, the Alaska-Yukon Exposition, and the tercentennial/centennial Hudson-Fulton Celebration in New York. A four-stamp series commemorating the Panama–Pacific International Exposition in San Francisco, California appeared in 1913, but no further commemoratives were issued until after World War I. The Lincoln Centennial's portrait format distinguished it from all other commemoratives released between 1893 and 1926, which were produced exclusively in landscape format. (The next U. S. commemorative in portrait orientation would be the Vermont Sesquicentennial issue of 1927, and many have appeared since.)

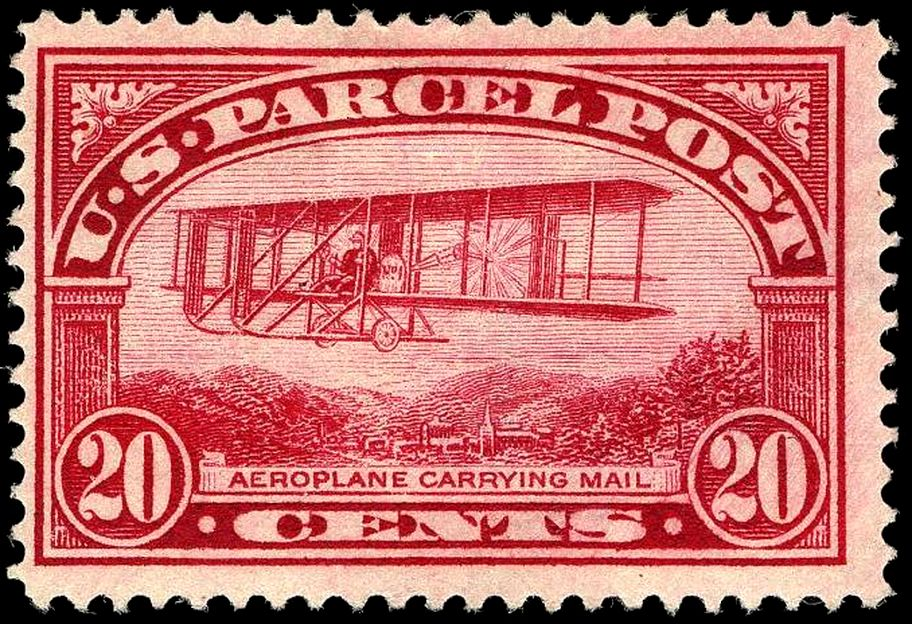
20¢ Parcel Post Stamp Issued in 1912. This was the first time in history an airplane appeared on a postage stamp.

It was also in 1913, in January, that the Post Office introduced domestic parcel post service (a belated development, given that international parcel post service between the United States and other countries began in 1887). A series of twelve Parcel Post stamps intended for this service had already been released in December 1912, ranging in denomination from 1¢ to $1. All were printed in red and designed in the wide Columbian format. The eight lowest values illustrated aspects of mail handling and delivery, while higher denominations depicted such industries as Manufacturing, Dairying and Fruit Growing. Five green Parcel Post Postage Due stamps appeared concurrently. It soon became obvious that none of these stamps was needed: parcel postage could easily be paid by definitive or commemorative issues, and normal postage due stamps were sufficient for parcels. When original stocks ran out, no reprints appeared, nor were replacements for either group ever contemplated. However, one denomination introduced in the Parcel Post series—20¢—had proved useful, and the Post Office added this value to the Washington-Franklin issues in 1914, along with a 30¢ stamp.

On November 3, 1917, the normal letter rate was raised from 2¢ to 3¢ in support of the war effort. The rate hike was reflected in the first postwar commemorative—a 3¢ "victory" stamp released on March 3, 1919 (not until July 1 would postal fees return to peacetime levels). Only once before (with the Lincoln Memorial issue of 1909) had the Post Office issued a commemorative stamp unconnected to an important national exposition; and the appearance of the Pilgrim Tercentenary series in 1920 confirmed that a new policy was developing: the Post Office would no longer need the pretext of significant patriotic trade fairs to issue commemoratives: they could now freely produce stamps commemorating the anniversaries of any notable historical figures, organizations or events.

In 1918, the post office printed its second two color stamp, featuring the Curtiss JN-4 airplane. The initial version released on May 10, 1918, contained the image of the plane printed upside-down in error. Only a sheet of 100 of this error is known to exist, which was broken up into smaller pieces and resold. The stamp became known as the Inverted Jenny. It is one of the most popular stamp errors in US history. Since 2007, several copies have sold for over $1 million USD in auctions.

== The 1920s and 1930s ==
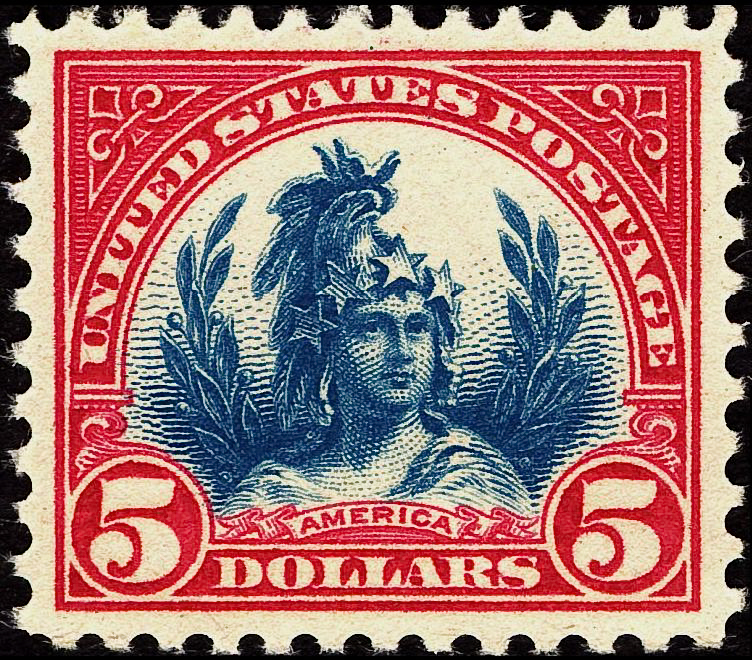
1923 Freedom, $5, blue and red

The stamps of the 1920s were dominated by the Series of 1922, the first new design of definitive stamps to appear in a generation. The lower values mostly depicted various presidents, with the 5c particularly intended as a memorial of the recently deceased Theodore Roosevelt, while the higher values included an "American Indian" (Hollow Horn Bear), the Statue of Liberty, Golden Gate (without the bridge, which had yet to be built), Niagara Falls, a bison, the Lincoln Memorial and so forth. Higher values of the series (from 17¢ through $5) were differentiated from the cheaper stamps by being designed in horizontal (landscape) rather than vertical format, an idea carried over from the "big Bens" of the Washington-Franklin series.

Stamp printing was switching from a flat plate press to a rotary press while these stamps were in use, and most come in two perforations as a result; 11 for flat plate, and 11x10.5 for rotary. In 1929, theft problems in the Midwest led to the Kansas-Nebraska overprints on the regular stamps. (See also: Fourth Bureau issue).

From 1924 on, commemorative stamps appeared every year. The 1920s saw several 150th anniversaries connected with the American Revolutionary War, and several stamps were issued in connection with those. These included the first U.S. souvenir sheet, for the Battle of White Plains sesquicentennial, and the first overprint, reading "MOLLY / PITCHER", the heroine of the Battle of Monmouth.

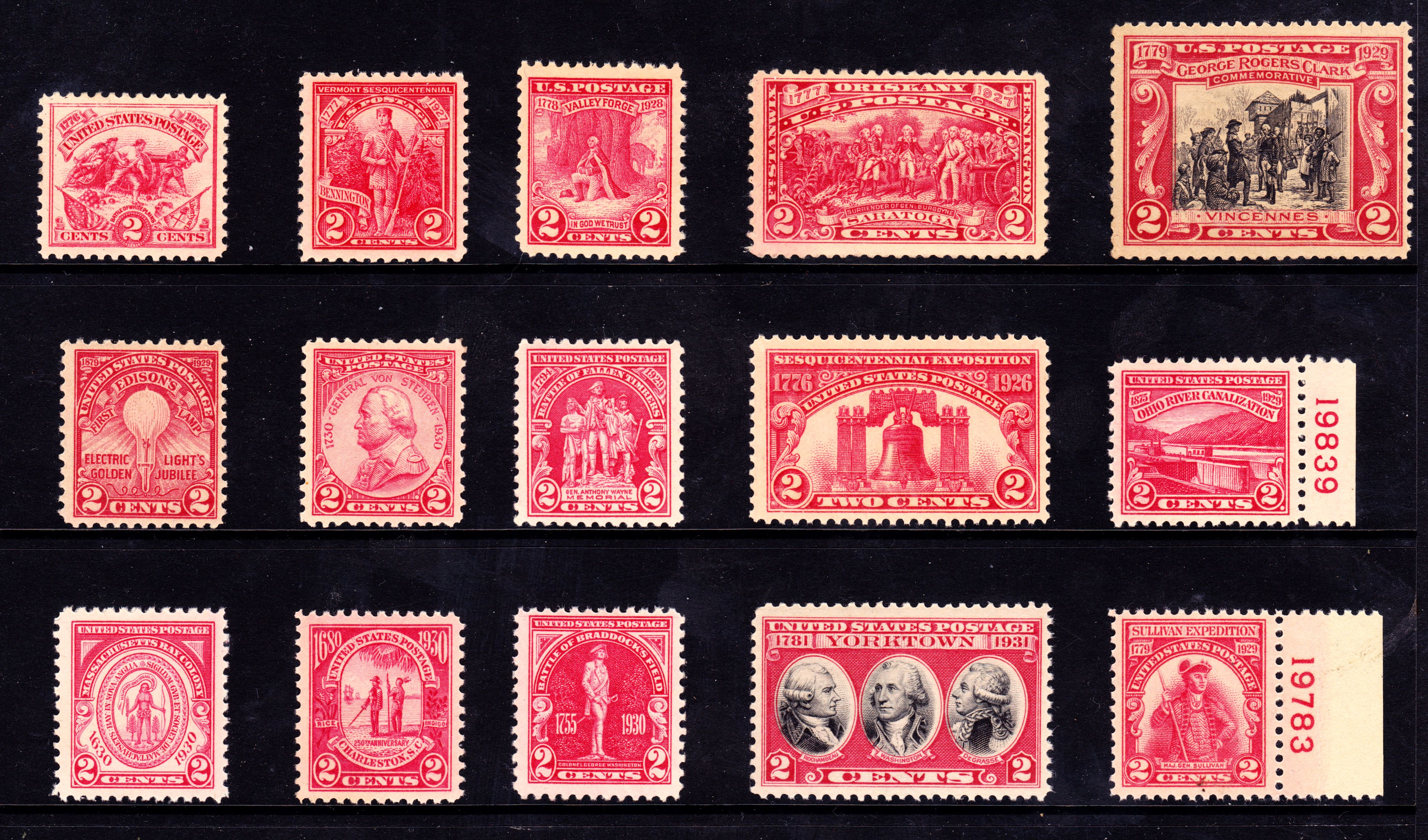
Two Cent Red Sesquicentennial issues of 1926–1932

=== Two Cent Red Sesquicentennial issues of 1926–1932 ===
During this period, the U.S. Post Office issued more than a dozen 'Two Cent Reds' commemorating the 150th anniversaries of Battles and Events that occurred during the American Revolution. The first among these was the Liberty Bell 150th Anniversary Issue of 1926, designed by Clair Aubrey Huston, and engraved by J.Eissler & E.M.Hall, two of America's most renowned master engravers. The 'Two Cent Reds' were among the last stamps used to carry a letter for 2 cents, the rate changing to 3 cents on July 6, 1932. The rate remained the same for 26 years until it finally changed to 4 cents in 1958.

=== Graf Zeppelin stamps ===
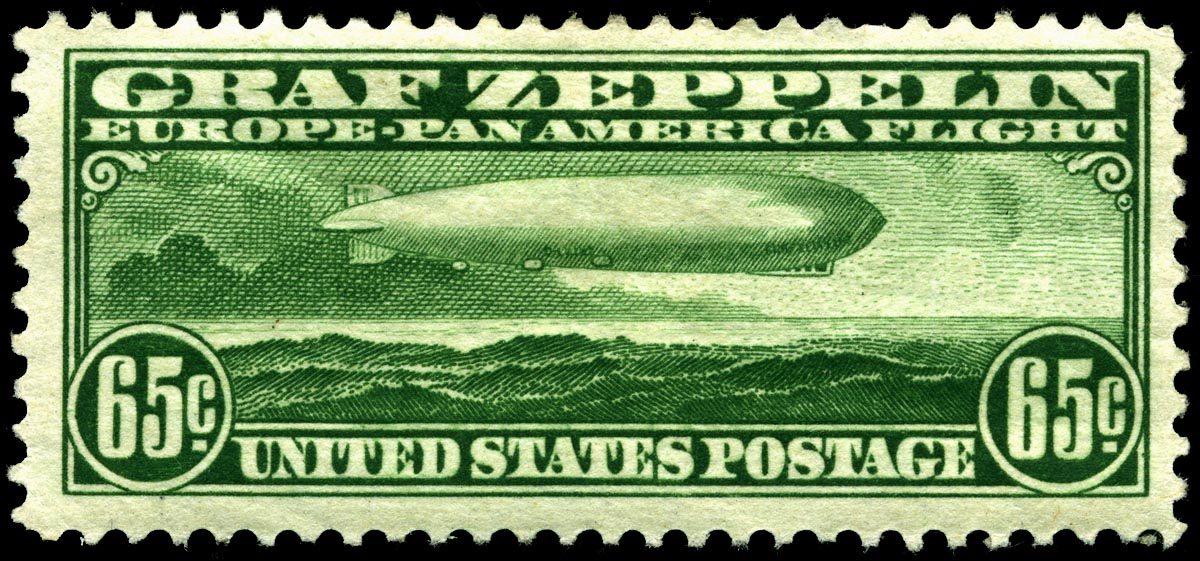
65-cent "Zeppelin" of 1930, issued in April for the May–June Pan-American flight of the Graf Zeppelin

The German zeppelins were of much interest during this period, and in 1930 the department issued special stamps to be used on the Pan-American flight of Graf Zeppelin.

Although the Graf Zeppelin stamps are today highly prized by collectors as masterpieces of the engraver's art, in 1930 the recent stock market crash meant that few were able to afford these stamps (the $4.55 value for the set represented a week's food allowance for a family of four). Less than 10 percent of the 1,000,000 of each denomination issued were sold and the remainder were incinerated (the stamps were only available for sale to the public from April 19, 1930, to June 30, 1930). It is estimated that less than 8 percent of the stamps produced survive today and they remain the smallest U.S. issue of the 20th century (only 229,260 of these stamps were ever purchased, and only 61,296 of the $2.60 stamps were sold).

=== Washington bicentennial issue ===
In 1932, a set of 12 stamps was issued to celebrate George Washington's 200th birthday 1932 Washington Bicentennial. For the 2¢ value, which satisfied the normal letter rate, the most familiar Gilbert Stuart image of Washington had been chosen. After postal rates rose that July, this 2¢ red Washington was redesigned as a 3¢ stamp and issued in the purple color that now became ubiquitous among U.S. commemoratives.

=== The New Deal Era ===
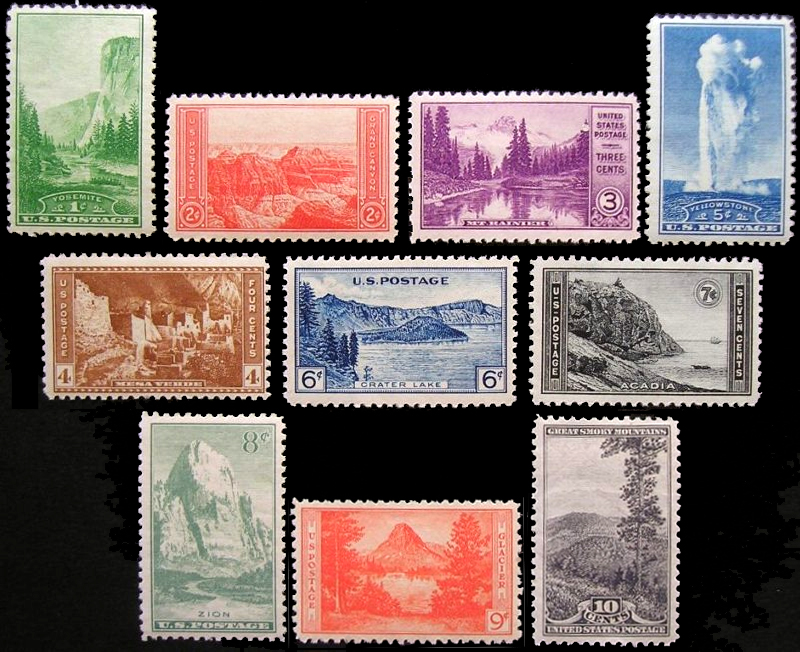
National Parks Issue

In 1933, Franklin D. Roosevelt became president. He was notable not only as an avid collector in his own right (with a collection estimated at around 1 million stamps) but also for taking an interest in the stamp issues of the department, working closely with Postmaster James Farley, the former Democratic Party Committee Chairman. Many designs of the 1930s were inspired or altered according to Roosevelt's advice. In 2009–10, the National Postal Museum exhibited six Roosevelt sketches that were developed into stamp issues: the 6-cent eagle airmail stamp and five miscellaneous commemoratives, which honored the Byrd Antarctic Expedition, the Mothers of America, Susan B. Anthony, Virginia Dare, and the Northwest Territories rise to statehood. A steady stream of commemoratives appeared during these years, including a striking 1934 issue of ten stamps presenting iconic vistas of ten National Parks—a set that has remained widely beloved. (In a memorable sequence from Philip Roth's novel The Plot Against America, the young protagonist dreams that his National Parks stamps, the pride, and joy of his collection, have become disfigured with swastika overprints.) Choosing an orange color for the 2¢ Grand Canyon tableau instead of the standard 2¢ carmine red, the Post Office departed from U. P. U. color-coding for the first time.

With a philatelist in the White House, the Post Office catered to collectors as never before, issuing seven separate souvenir sheets between 1933 and 1937. In one case, a collectors' series had to be produced as the result of a miscalculation. Around 1935, Postmaster Farley removed sheets of the National Parks set from stock before they had been gummed or perforated, giving these and unfinished examples of ten other issues to President Roosevelt and Interior Secretary Harold Ickes (also a philatelist) as curiosities for their collections. When word of these gifts got out, public outcries arose. Some accused Farley of a corrupt scheme to enrich Roosevelt and Ickes by creating valuable rarities for them at taxpayer expense. Stamp aficionados, in turn, demanded that these curiosities be sold to the public so that ordinary collectors could acquire them, and Farley duly issued them in bulk. This series of special printings soon became known as "Farley's Follies". As the decade progressed, the purples used for 3¢ issues, although still ostensibly conforming to the traditional purple, displayed an increasingly wide variety of hues, and one 1940 issue, a 3¢ stamp commemorating the Pony Express, dispensed with purple entirely, appearing in a rust brown earth tone more suitable to the image of a horse and rider departing from a western rural post office.

=== Presidential Issue of 1938 ===
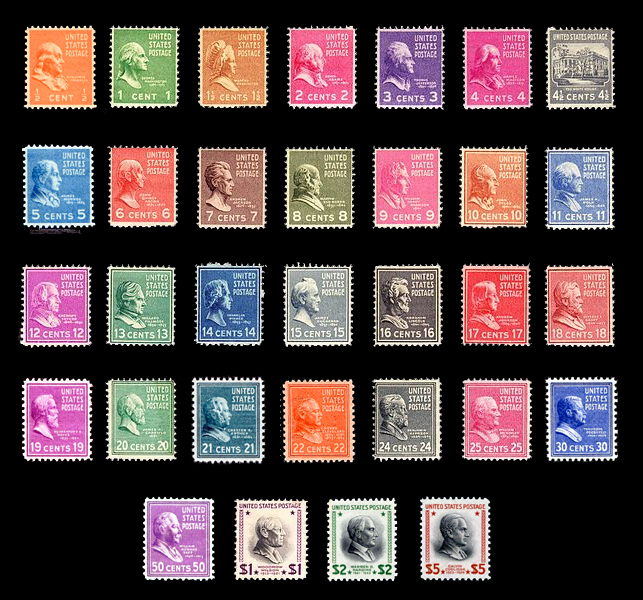
Presidential issue of 1938

The famous Presidential Issue, known as "Prexies" for short, came out in 1938. The series featured all 29 U.S. presidents through Calvin Coolidge, each of whom appeared in profile as a small sculptural bust. Values of 50¢ and lower were mono-colored; on the $1, $2, and $5 stamps the presidents' images were printed in black on white, surrounded by colored lettering and ornamentation. Up through the 22¢ Cleveland stamp, the denomination assigned to each president corresponds to his position in the presidential roster: thus the first president, Washington, is on the 1¢ value, the seventeenth, Andrew Johnson, is on the 17¢ value, etc. Additional stamps depict Franklin (½¢), Martha Washington (1½¢), and the White House (4½¢). Many of the values were included merely to place the presidents in proper numerical order and did not necessarily correspond to a postal rate; and one of the (difficult) games for Prexie collectors is to find a cover with, for instance, a single 16¢ stamp that pays a combination of rate and fees valid during the Prexies' period of usage. Many such covers remain to be discovered; some sellers on eBay have been surprised to discover an ordinary-seeming cover bid up to several hundred dollars because it was one of the sought-after solo usages. The Presidential issue remained in distribution for many years. Not until 1954 did the Post Office begin replacing its values with the stamps of a new definitive issue, the Liberty series.

== Famous Americans Series of 1940 ==
In 1940, the U.S. Post Office issued a set of 35 stamps, issued over the course of approximately ten months, commemorating America's famous authors, poets, educators, scientists, composers, artists and inventors. The educators included Booker T. Washington, became the first African-American to be honored on a U.S. stamp. This series of postage issues was printed by the Bureau of Engraving and Printing. These stamps were larger in size than normal definitive issues, with only 280 stamp images contained on the printing plate (400 images was standard for the Presidential series). Notable also is the red-violet color chosen for the 3¢ stamps, a brighter hue than the traditional purple.

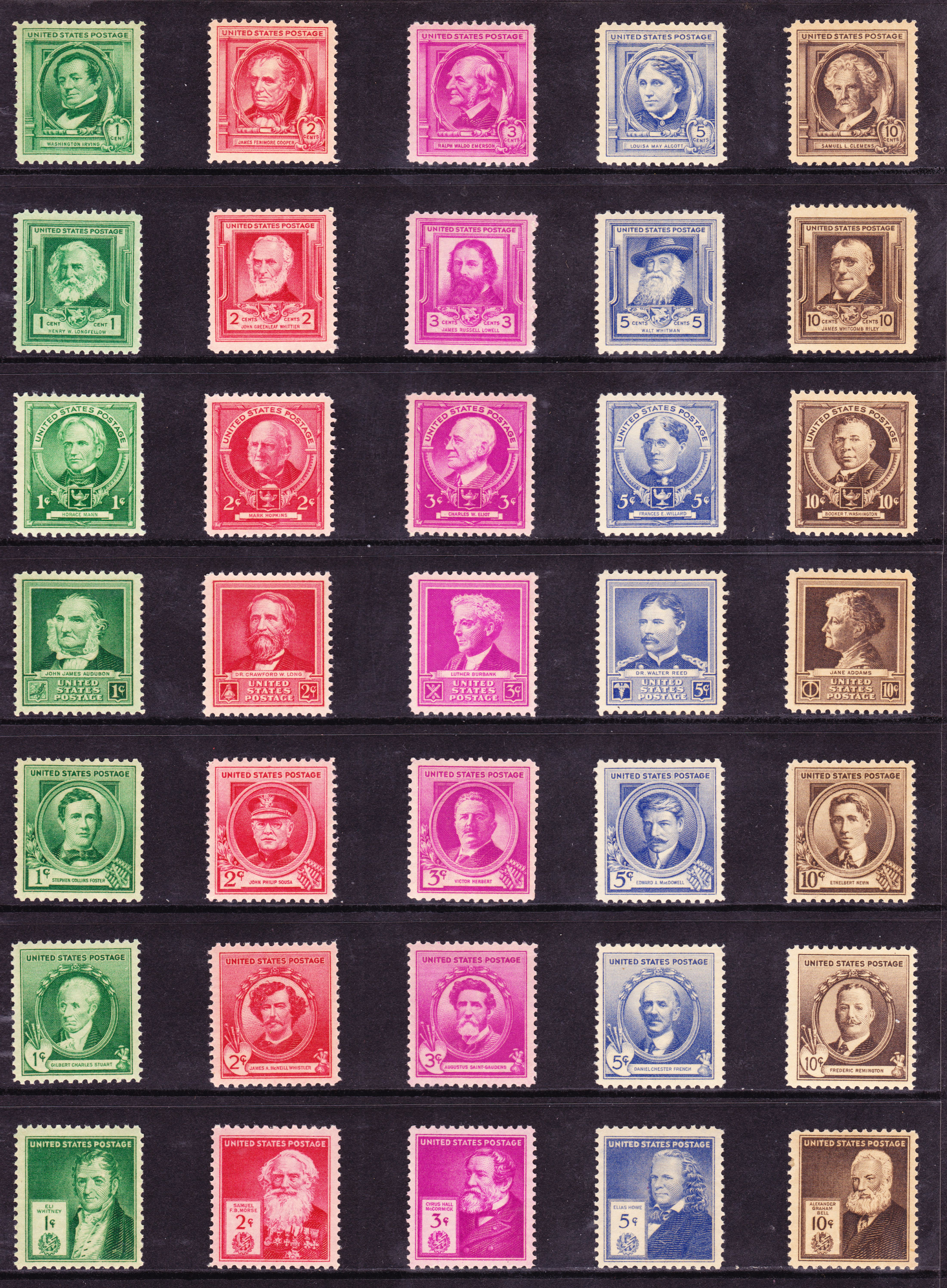
Famous American Series of 1940

Authors: Washington Irving – James Fenimore Cooper – Ralph Waldo Emerson – Louisa May Alcott –Samuel Clemens

Poets: Henry Wadsworth Longfellow – John Greenleaf Whittier – James Russell Lowell – Walt Whitman – James Whitcomb Riley

Educators: Horace Mann – Mark Hopkins – Charles W. Eliot – Frances E. Willard – Booker T. Washington

Scientists: John James Audubon – Dr. Crawford W. Long – Luther Burbank – Dr. Walter Reed – Jane Addams

Composers: Stephen Collins Foster – John Philip Sousa – Victor Herbert – Edward A. MacDowell – Ethelbert Nevin

Artists: Gilbert Charles Stuart – James McNeill Whistler – Augustus Saint-Gaudens – Daniel Chester French – Frederic Remington

Inventors: Eli Whitney – Samuel F. B. Morse – Cyrus Hall McCormick – Elias Howe – Alexander Graham Bell

== World War II ==
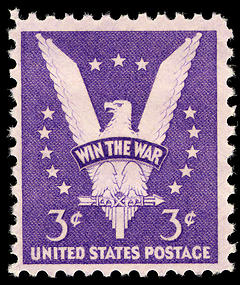
Win the War, 1942

During World War II, production of new U. S. 3¢ commemorative stamps all but ceased. Among the three issues that appeared in 1942 was the celebrated Win the War stamp, which enjoyed enormously wide use, owing partly to patriotism and partly to the relative unavailability of alternatives. It presents an art deco eagle posed in a "V" shape for victory surrounded by 13 stars. The eagle is grasping arrows, but has no olive branch.

In 1942, the first U.S. stamp to feature a foreign language was issued. The five-cent stamp commemorated the alliance between the United States and China. Under portraits of Abraham Lincoln and Sun Yat-sen, the stamp has a map of China and the slogan "Fight the War and Build the Country" in Chinese. The ceremony commemorating its release was attended by Franklin D. Roosevelt and T. V. Soong.

A notable commemorative set appeared in 1943–1944, but its stamps, all valued at 5 cents, were not competitive with the Win the War issue. This was the Overrun Countries series (known to collectors as the Flag set), produced as a tribute to the thirteen nations that had been occupied by the Axis powers.

The thirteen stamps present full color images of the national flags of Poland, Czechoslovakia, Norway, Luxembourg, the Netherlands, Belgium, France, Greece, Yugoslavia, Albania, Austria, Denmark, and Korea, with the names of the respective countries written beneath. To the left of each flag appears the image of the phoenix, which symbolizes the renewal of life, and to its right appears a kneeling female figure with arms raised, breaking the shackles of servitude.

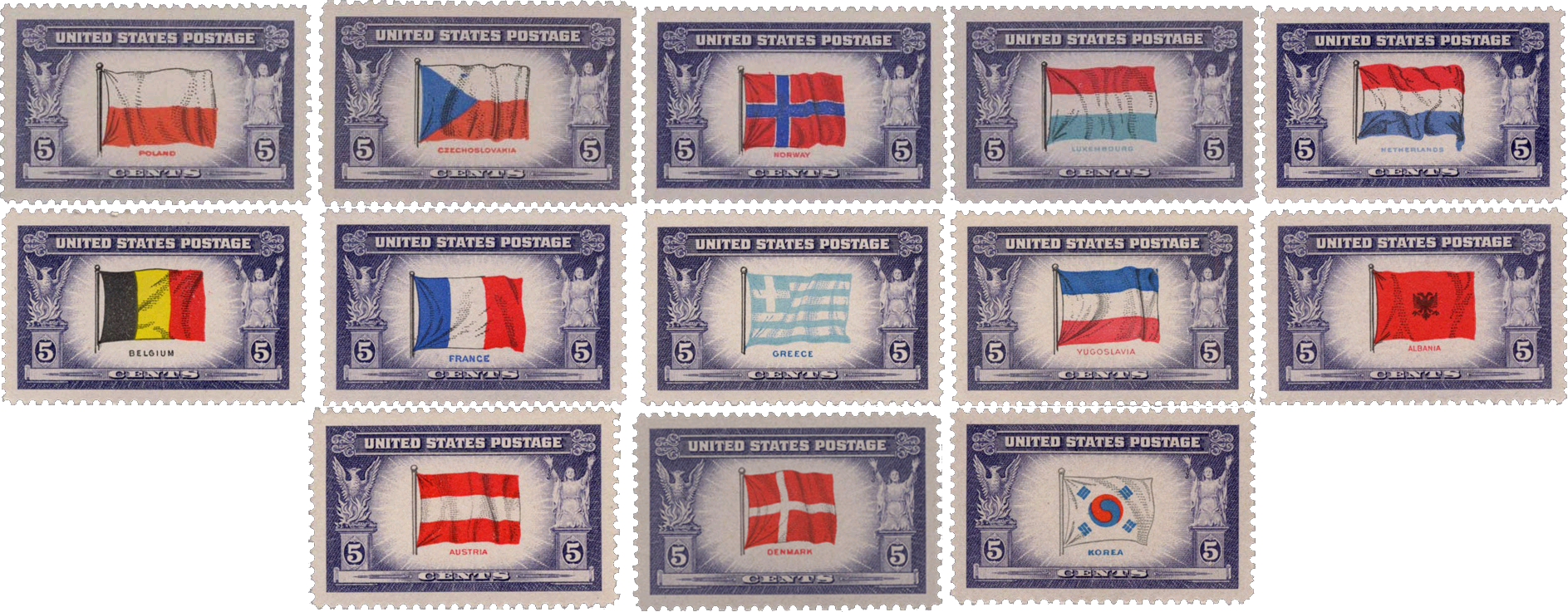
Overrun Countries stamps

The stamps with flags of European countries were released at intervals from June to December 1943, while the Korea flag stamp was released in November 1944. These stamps were priced at 5 cents, although the standard cost for a first-class stamp was 3 cents. These stamps were intended for use on V-mail, a means whereby mail intended for military personnel overseas was delivered with certainty.

The service persons overseas used the same method for writing letters home, and the same process was used to reconstruct their letters, except that their postage was free.

The two-cent surcharge on the V-mail letters helped pay for the additional expense of this method of delivery.

Because of the elaborate process necessary for the full-color printing, the Bureau of Engraving and Printing contracted with a private firm, the American Bank Note Company, to produce the series – the first U. S. stamps to be printed by a private company since 1893. Uniquely among U. S. issues, the sheets lack the plate numbers usually printed on the selvage surrounding the stamps. In the places where the numbers normally appear on each sheet, the name of the country is substituted, engraved in capital letters.

== Post-World War II ==
The post-World War II stamp program followed a consistent pattern for many years: a steady stream of commemorative issues sold as single stamps at the first-class letter rate. While the majority of these were designed in the double-width format, an appreciable number issued in honor of individuals conformed instead to the format, size, general design style, and red-violet hue used in the 1940 Famous Americans series.

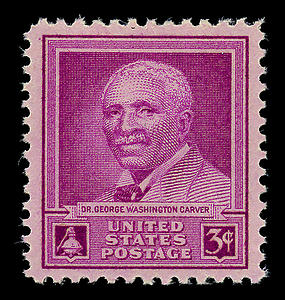
George W. Carver, 1948

The Postal Service had become increasingly lax about employing purple for 3¢ stamps, and after the war, departures from that color in double-width commemoratives veritably became the rule rather than the exception (although U. P. U. colors and purple for 3¢ stamps would continue to be used in the definitive issues of the next decades). Beginning in 1948, Congressional Representatives and Senators began to push the Post Office for stamps proposed by constituents, leading to a relative flood of stamps honoring obscure persons and organizations. The stamp issue did not again become well regulated until the formation of the Citizens' Stamp Advisory Committee (CSAC) in 1957.

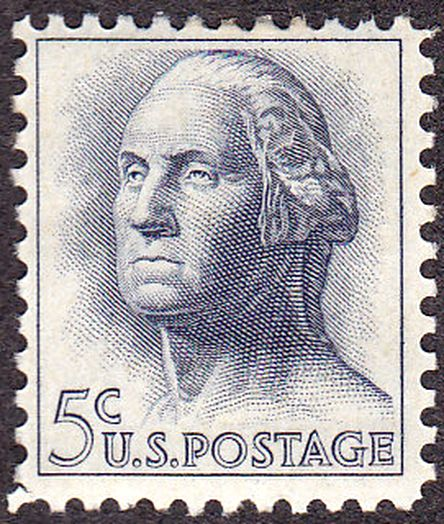
5¢ George Washington Regular Issue, 1962

The Liberty issue of 1954, deep in the Cold War, took a much more political slant than previous issues. The common first-class stamp was a 3¢ Statue of Liberty in purple, and included the inscription "In God We Trust", the first explicit religious reference on a U.S. stamp (ten days before the issue of the 3¢ Liberty stamp, the words "under God" had been inserted into the Pledge of Allegiance). The Statue of Liberty appeared on two additional higher values as well, 8¢ and 11¢, both of which were printed in two colors. The other stamps in the series included liberty-related statesmen and landmarks, such as Patrick Henry and Bunker Hill, although other subjects, (Benjamin Harrison, for example) seem unrelated to the basic theme.

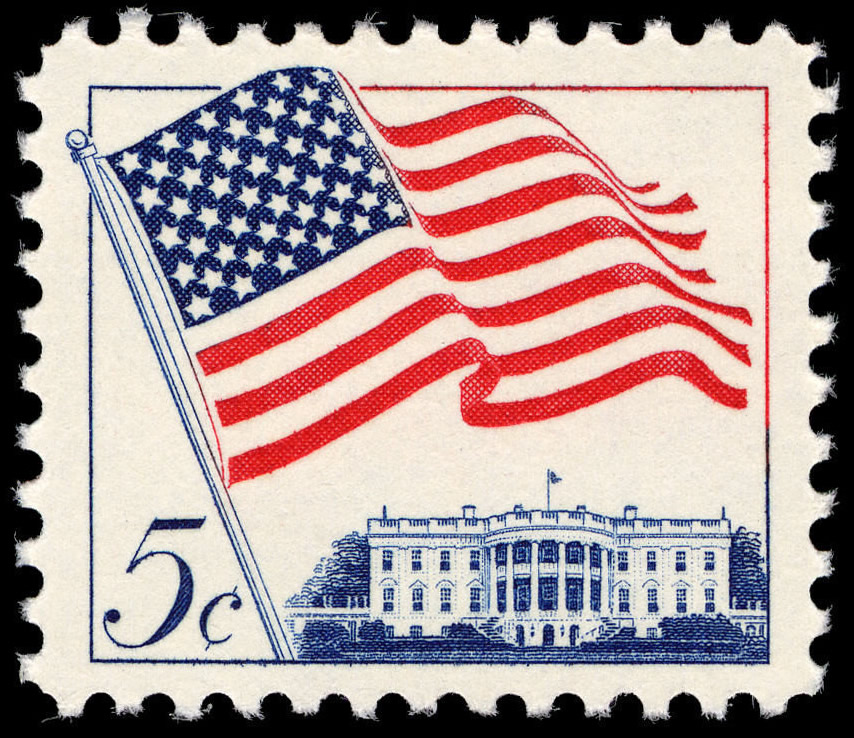
American Flag, 1963

In 1957, the American Flag was featured on a U. S. stamp for the first time. The Post Office had long avoided this image, fearing accusations that, in issuing stamps on which they would be defacing the flag by cancellation marks, they would be both committing and fomenting desecration. However, protests against this initial flag issue were muted, and the flag has remained a perennially popular U. S. stamp subject ever since.

The 3¢ rate for first-class had been unchanged since 1932, but by 1958 there were no more efficiency gains to keep the lid on prices, and the rate went to 4¢, beginning a steady series of rate increases that reached 49¢ as of January 26, 2014.

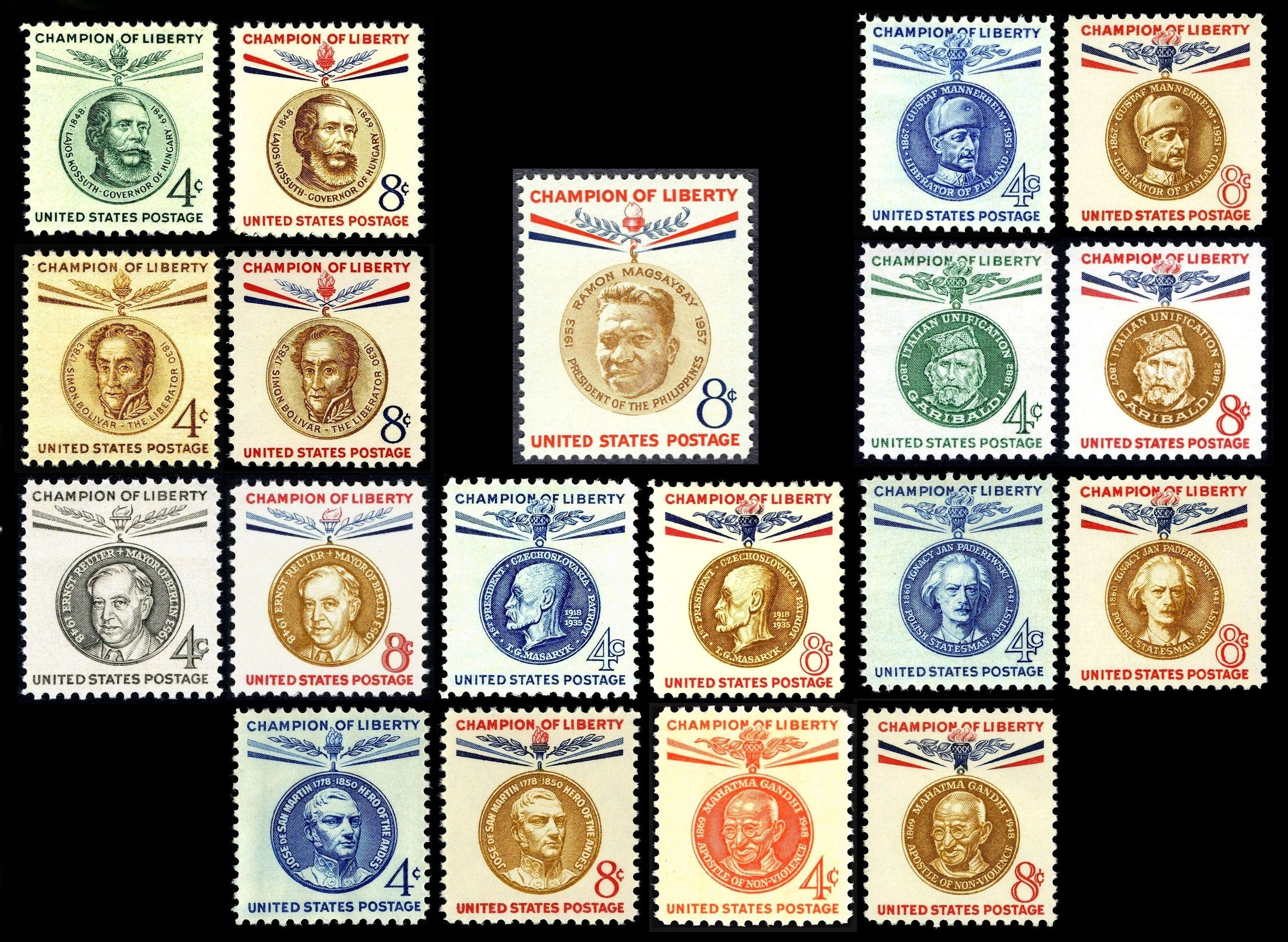
Champion of Liberty series of 1957–1961

From 1957 to 1961 the U.S. post office issued the Champion of Liberty series of stamps, consisting of nineteen commemorative stamps issued periodically. The stamps featured various men who fought for freedom and independence in their home countries and are considered "Champions of Liberty". Issued during the Cold War these stamps also served as a counter-point to the perceived totalitarianism of the Soviet Union.

The Prominent Americans series superseded the "Liberties" in the 1960s and proved the last definitive issue to conform to the Universal Postal Union color code. In the 1970s, they were replaced by the Americana series, in which colors became purely a matter of designer preference.

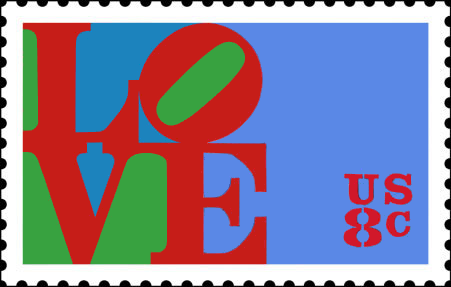
1973 "Love" stamp

In 1971, the Post Office was reorganized in accordance with the Postal Reorganization Act of 1970, becoming the United States Postal Service (USPS). However, it is still heavily regulated, with, for instance, the CSAC continuing to decide which commemorative stamps to issue.

The Bicentennial Series began with the issuance of a stamp showing the logo for the Bicentennial celebrations in 1971 and concluded in 1983.

In January 1973, the USPS began to issue "Love" stamps for use on Valentine's Day and other special occasions such as weddings, birthdays, anniversaries and letters to loved ones. The first such issue was an 8 cents stamp that the Postal Service initially titled "Special Stamp for Someone Special". The stamp was based on a pop art image that Robert Indiana had designed during the 1960s (see "Love" sculpture). The 1973 issue had a printing production of 320 million stamps.

== Air Mail ==
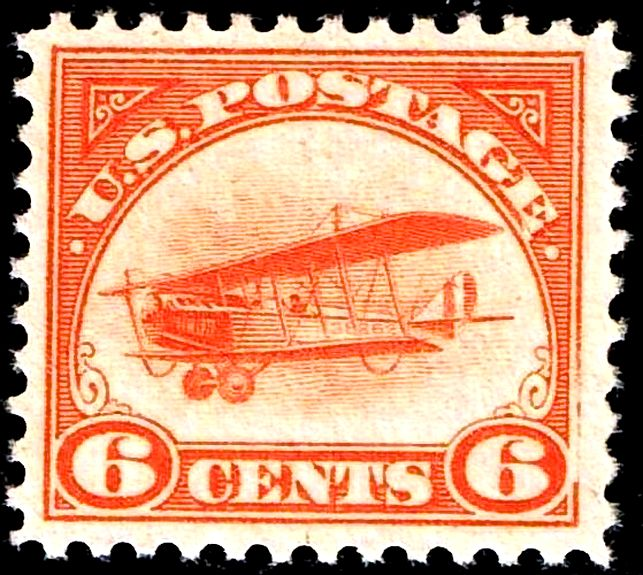
1918 6¢ was the same design as the notable 24-cent Inverted Jenny variety of this series.

Airmail in the United States Post Office emerged in three stages beginning with the 'pioneer period' where there were many unofficial flights carrying the mail prior to 1918, the year the US Post Office assumed delivery of all Air Mail. The US Post office began contracting out to the private sector to carry the mail (Contract Air Mail, CAM) on February 15, 1926. In 1934, all US Air Mail was carried by the U.S. Army for six months, after which the contract system resumed.

== Abraham Lincoln postage issues ==
In 1866, about a year after Abraham Lincoln's assassination, the U.S. Post Office issued its first postage stamp honoring the fallen President. The Post Office stated that the release took place on June 17. Some sources, however, believe that the stamp was introduced on April 14, the one-year anniversary of Lincoln's death, and one notable expert made an (unverifiable) claim that the stamp first saw use on April 15. In any case, it is considered by some as America's first commemorative stamp. From that point on Lincoln's portrait appeared on a variety of U.S. postage stamps and today exists on more than a dozen issues. Lincoln is also honored on commemorative stamps issued by Costa Rica and Nicaragua. With the exceptions of George Washington and Benjamin Franklin, Lincoln appears on US Postage more than any other American.

Lincoln Issues

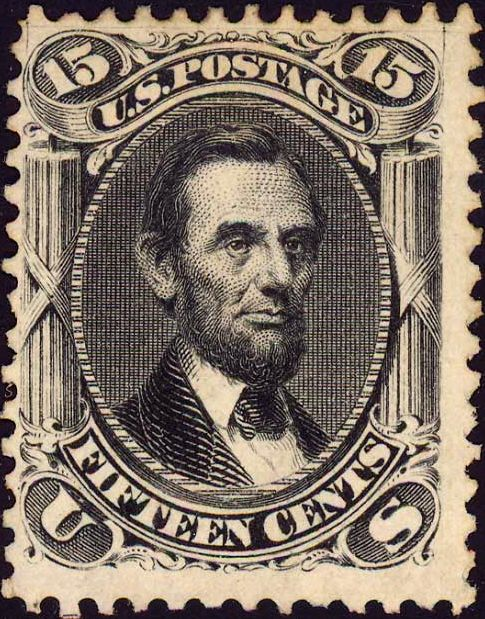
The first Lincoln postage stamp issue of 1866

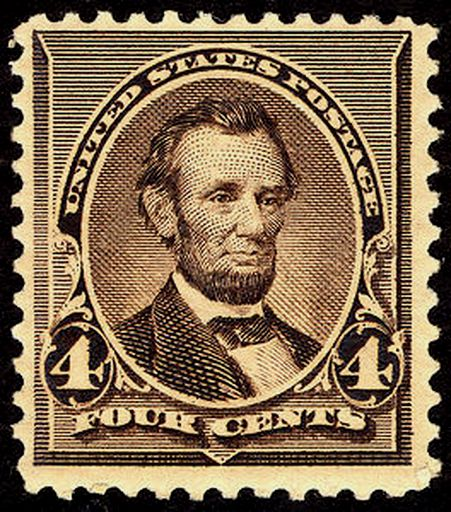
Issue of 1890

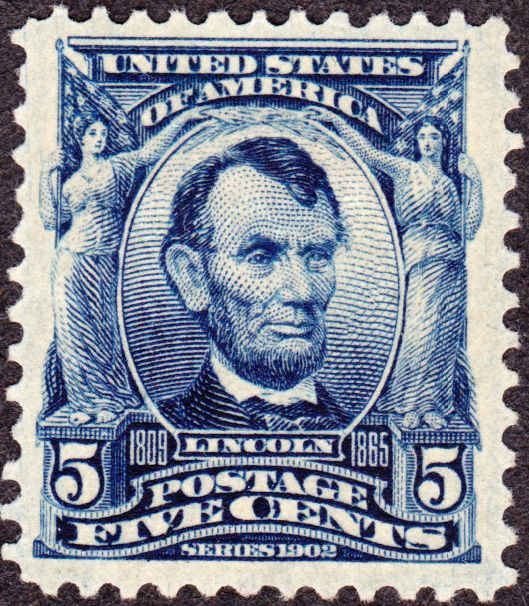
Issue of 1903

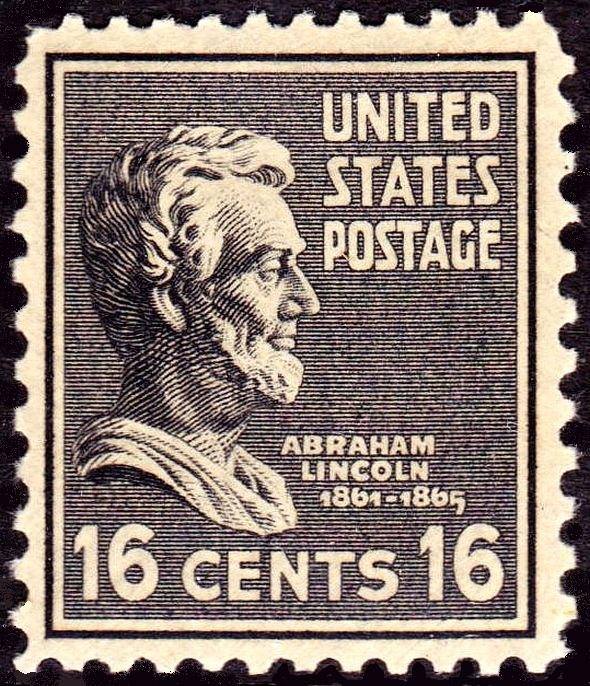
Issue of 1938

== Modern U.S. stamps ==
The first self-adhesive stamp was a 10 cent stamp from the Christmas issue of 1974. It was not considered successful, and the surviving stamps, though not rare, are all gradually becoming discolored due to the adhesive used. Self-adhesives were not issued again until 1989, gradually becoming so popular that as of 2004, only a handful of types are offered with the traditional gum (now affectionately called "manual stamps" by postal employees).

The increasing frequency of postal rate increases from the 1970s on, and the necessity to wait for these to be approved by Congress, made it problematic for the Postal Service to provide stamps matching the increased costs in a timely manner. Until it was known, for example, whether the new first-class rate would be 16¢ or, instead, 15¢, no denominated stamp could be printed. The Postal Service found a way to bypass this problem in 1978. Preparatory to that year's increase, an orange colored stamp with a simple eagle design appeared bearing the denomination "A" instead of a number; and the public was informed that this stamp would satisfy the new first-class rate, whatever it turned out to be. Subsequent rate increases resulted in B, C and D stamps, which bore the same eagle design but were printed, respectively, in purple, buff-brown and blue-green. When it came time for an E stamp in 1987, the Postal Service commissioned a more elaborate design: a color picture of the globe as seen from space (E for Earth). Rises since have prompted F for Flower, G for Old Glory and H for Hat stamps, all appropriately illustrated. The F stamp in 1991 was accompanied by an undenominated "make-up" stamp with no pictorial design beyond a frame, which enclosed the words "This U. S. stamp, along with 25¢ of additional U. S. postage, is equivalent to the 'F' stamp rate."

The Great Americans series and the Transportation coils began appearing in 1980 and 1981, respectively. The transportation coils were used steadily for some 20 years, while Great Americans was replaced by the Distinguished Americans series, which began in 2000.

The increasing use of email and other technologies during the 1990s led to a decline in the amount of first-class mail, while bulk mail increased. A large variety of commemorative stamps continue to appear, but more of them just go to collectors, while the stamps of the average person's daily mail are non-denominated types issued specifically for businesses.

The first US postage stamp to incorporate microprinting as a security feature was the American Wildflower Series introduced by the United States Postal Service in 1992. It was also the first commemorative stamp to be wholly produced by offset lithography. The USPS has since issued other stamps with more complex microprinting incorporated along with dates, words, and abbreviations such as USPS and even entire stamp designs composed of microprint letters.

The first US stamp to officially honor a black American was issued in 1940, featuring Booker T. Washington. However, it wasn't until 1978 did the USPS started the Black Heritage series, the first stamp featuring Harriet Tubman. As of today, the Black Heritage series is the longest running U.S. stamp series.

In 1994, the USPS released a sheet of stamps titled Legends of the West, which contained an error. It featured a misidentification, portraying African-American rodeo performer Bill Pickett's younger brother, Ben Pickett, instead of Bill himself. The stamps were recalled and reprinted with the correct photo, but due to the demand of the collectors and to recoup some of the printing revenue lost, the post office released 150,000 of the stamp sheets by lottery.

In 2005, after 111 years of producing American postage stamps, the Bureau of Engraving and Printing ended its involvement with the postal service.

On April 12, 2007, the Forever stamp went on sale for 41 cents, and is good for mailing one-ounce First-Class letters anytime in the future—regardless of price changes. On the same day, the Postal Service also issued an American flag stamp with the text "USA First Class", whose value is fixed at 41 cents. In 2011, the Post Office began issuing all new stamps for First-Class postage—both definitives and commemoratives—as Forever stamps: denominations were no longer included on them. Beginning in 2015, the Post Office made all other stamps Forever stamps-Postcard, Additional Ounce, Two Ounce, Three Ounce, and Non-Machinable Surcharge, and these types of stamps now have their use printed on them instead of a number.

On February 25, 2010, the United States Court of Appeals for the Federal Circuit ruled 2–1 that Frank Gaylord, sculptor of a portion of the Korean War Veterans Memorial, was entitled to compensation when an image of that sculpture was used on a 37-cent postage stamp because he had not signed away his intellectual property rights to the sculpture when it was erected. The appeals court rejected arguments that the photo was transformative. In 2006 sculptor Frank Gaylord enlisted Fish & Richardson to make a pro bono claim that the Postal Service had violated his Intellectual property rights to the sculpture and thus should have been compensated. The Postal Service argued that Gaylord was not the sole sculptor (saying he had received advice from federal sources—who recommended that the uniforms appear more in the wind) and also that the sculpture was actually architecture. Gaylord won all of his arguments in the lower court except for one: the court ruled the photo was fair use and thus he was not entitled to compensation. Gaylord appealed and won the case on appeal. In 2011, the US Court of Federal Claims awarded Gaylord $5,000. On appeal, the US Court of Appeals for the Federal Circuit vacated the order and remanded the case back to the US Court of Federal Claims and in September 2013, the US Court of Federal Claims awarded Gaylord more than $600,000 in damages.

Later in the 2010s, automated stamp and bank automatic teller machines began dispensing thinner stamps. The thin stamps were to make it easier for automated stamp machines to dispense and to make the stamps more environmentally friendly.

On January 26, 2014, the postal service raised the price of First-class postage stamps to 49 cents. Rates for other mail, including postcards and packages, also increased.

Starting in 2005, the USPS offered customers the ability to design and purchase custom stamps, which were offered through third-party providers, like Stamps.com and Zazzle. The USPS prohibited certain types of images (such as alcohol, tobacco, gambling, weapons, controlled substances, political content, religious content, violent content, or sexual content) from being used on the custom stamps. The rules generated some controversy by uneven enforcement of the rules against the use of purportedly religious and political imagery. This eventually led to two lawsuits, Zukerman v. United States Postal Serv. and Fletcher v. United States Postal Serv. On June 9, 2020, the District of Columbia Circuit ruled in Zukerman v. United States Postal Serv. that the content rules did not meet the "objective, workable standards" test established in Minnesota Voters Alliance v. Mansky. One week later, the USPS discontinued the custom stamp program.

=== New stamps ===
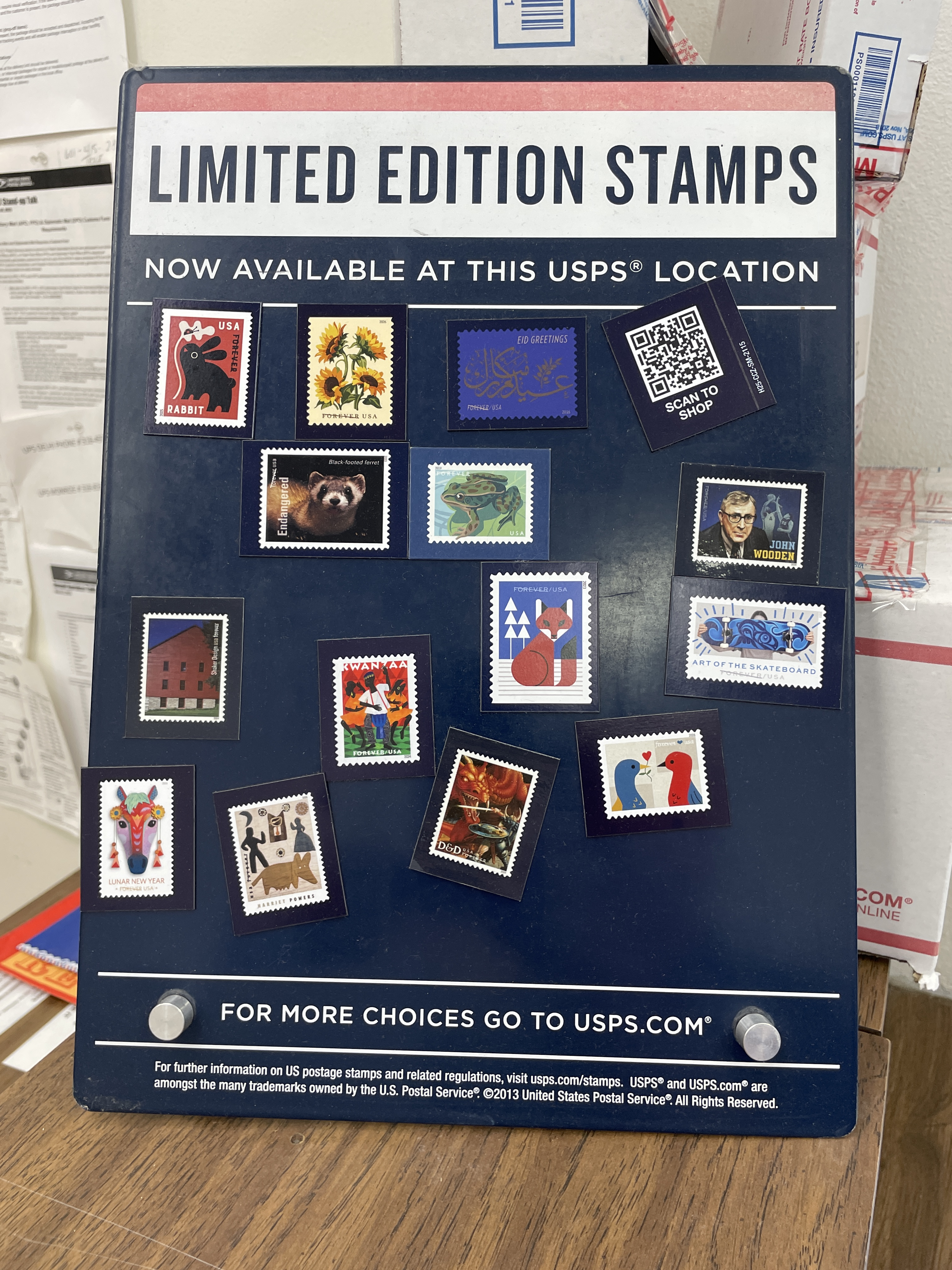
USPS stamp magnet display in the Tallulah, Louisiana post office.

Twelve criteria for new stamps and postal stationery include that "events of historical significance shall be considered for commemoration only on anniversaries in multiples of 50 years." For many years, these included the restriction that "no postal item will be issued sooner than five years after the individual's death," with an exception provided for stamps memorializing recently deceased U.S. Presidents. In September 2011, however, the postal service announced that, in an attempt to increase flagging revenues, stamps would soon offer images of celebrated living persons, chosen by the Committee in response to suggestions submitted by the public via surface mail and social networks on the Internet. The revised criterion reads: "The Postal Service will honor living men and women who have made extraordinary contributions to American society and culture."

On June 14, 2008, in Washington, DC, the Postal Service issued the first set of 10 designs in the 42–cent Flags of Our Nation stamps. The stamps were designed by Howard E. Paine of Delaplane, Virginia. Five subsequent sets of ten stamps each had appeared by August 16, 2012, bringing the total of stamp designs to sixty. Sets nos. 3 and 4 were denominated 44-cents, while the final two sets appeared as Forever stamps.

In August 2014, former Postmaster General Benjamin F. Bailar complained that the USPS was "prostituting" its stamps by focusing on stamps centered on popular culture, not cultural icons. He claims that this is a move aimed at making up for the USPS' revenue shortage at the expense of the values of the stamp program.

== Timeline ==
First-class postage rate history (nominal cents shown in dark blue, constant 2019 cents shown in light blue color)

- 1639: First American Post Office set up in Boston
- 1672: New York City mail service to Boston
- 1674: Mail service in Connecticut
- 1683: William Penn begins weekly service to Pennsylvania and Maryland villages and towns
- 1693: Service between colonies begins in Virginia
- 1775: First postmaster general appointed: Benjamin Franklin
- 1799: U.S. Congress passes law authorizing death penalty for mail robbery
- 1813: First mail carried by steamboat
- 1832: First official railroad mail service
- 1847: First U.S. postage stamps issued
- 1857: Perforated stamps introduced
- 1860: Pony Express started
- 1861: Mailing of post cards authorized
- 1873: Prestamped "postal cards" introduced
- 1879: Postage due stamps introduced
- 1885: Special Delivery service introduced
- 1893: First commemorative event stamps: World's Columbian Exposition in Chicago
- 1913: Domestic parcel post delivery began
- 1918: First airmail stamps introduced; Inverted Jenny stamp error
- 1920: Transcontinental mail between New York City and San Francisco
- 1940: First stamp that honors an African America issued, featuring Booker T. Washington.
- 1955: Certified Mail service introduced
- 1958: Well-known artists begin designing stamps
- 1963: 5-digit ZIP Codes introduced
- 1978: The USPS introduced the Black Heritage series.
- 1983: ZIP + 4 code introduced
- 1989: Priority Mail introduced
- 1992: Microprint introduced and first commemorative stamp developed entirely by offset lithography
- 1994: Legends of the West stamp error
- 1997: Special Delivery discontinued
- 2007: Forever stamps introduced

== See also ==
- Airmails of the United States
- Army and Navy stamp issues of 1936-1937
- Artists of stamps of the United States
- Constitutional Post
- Commemoration of the American Civil War on postage stamps
- Federal Duck Stamp
- History of United States postage rates
- List of people on stamps of the United States
- Pony Express
- Postage stamps and postal history of the Confederate States
- Postal history of Oregon
- Postage stamps and postal history of the Canal Zone
- Presidents of the United States on U.S. postage stamps
- U.S. Postage stamp locator
- Revenue stamps of the United States
- US Regular Issues of 1922-1931
- US space exploration history on US stamps
- American Credo postal Issues
- Washington-Franklin Issues
- Women on US stamps

== References and sources ==
Sources

- Lester G. Brookman, The Nineteenth Century Postage Stamps of the United States (Lindquist, 1947).
- John N. Luff and Benno Loewy, The Postage Stamps of the United States (New York, Scott Stamp & Coin Company, 1902).
- .
- .
- Stanley Gibbons Ltd: various catalogues.
- Max Johl, The United States Postage Stamps of the Twentieth Century (Lindquist, 1937).
- Scott catalog.
- Rossiter, Stuart & John Flower. The Stamp Atlas. London: Macdonald, 1986. ISBN 0-356-10862-7.
