= Legends of the West =

1994 United States postage stamp series

- Legends of the West with error
- Type: Miniature sheet
- Country of issue: United States
- Country of production: United States
- Date of issue: 9 October 1994
- Face value: $5.80 per sheet 29¢ per stamp

Legends of the West was a sheet of 29 cent stamps released by United States Postal Service (USPS) in 1994. The initial issue contained an error which resulted in a recall. It featured a misidentification, portraying African-American rodeo performer Bill Pickett's younger brother, Ben Pickett, instead of Bill himself. A corrected version of the stamp sheets was eventually released. However, due to the popular demand, the post office held a lottery and sold 150,000 sheets of the errors to the public.

This incident has become the most notorious stamp error incidents in the US history.

== Background ==
Designer Mark Hess had multiple images of Bill Pickett available, one of which depicted a handsome and youthful man holding a coiled lariat in front of trees, flowers, and an open gate. Clad in a complete cowboy outfit, including a broad-brimmed hat, shirt, vest, chaps, and cowboy boots, the inscription on the black and white photo described Bill Pickett as a famous Negro cowboy who pioneered the "bullogger" technique, using his teeth to bulldog instead of the conventional hands-on-horns method employed by cowboys today. Several other reputable references also identified the individual in the photograph as Bill Pickett. Consequently, the image received approval from Sheaff, Terrence McCaffrey (USPS project manager), and the Citizens' Stamp Advisory Committee (CSAC).

Frank Phillips, spokesperson for the Bill Pickett Family Foundation, recognized the error as he was well acquainted with the distinction between the two brothers. Frank's grandmother, Bessie Pickett Phillips, was the daughter of Bill Pickett, and his father, Frank Phillips Sr., had the privilege of seeing Bill Pickett frequently during his youth. Convinced that the person depicted in the widely circulated photograph was actually Ben Pickett, members of the Pickett family were disappointed to learn that their long-standing efforts to have a stamp featuring Bill Pickett had gone unnoticed due to lost correspondence within the postal bureaucracy.

The mistake was eventually brought to light in 1993 when Ruth Murphey, a collector and dealer of Bill Pickett and Wild West Show memorabilia, received a draft chapter for the Legends of the West Commemorative Album being prepared by the USPS. The chapter contained a picture of Pickett that Murphey immediately recognized as incorrect. She promptly reported the error to PhotoAssist, the firm responsible for assembling the material. Shortly after, Murphey received a call from Stamp Services at the USPS, thanking her for the information but indicating that it was too late to revise the stamp.

The discovery of the mistake gained media attention when Jim Etter, a reporter for the Daily Oklahomansought a Pickett photo to promote the Legends of the West pane. Upon contacting Glass Negative in Oklahoma, a repository of Old West photographs, he was informed about the incorrect depiction. Etter then reached out to Murphey to confirm the information. Subsequently, on January 7, 1994, the newspaper published an article titled "Cowboy's Fans Fear Stamp Inaccurate."

Upon learning of the media coverage, Frank Phillips went to USPS headquarters in Washington to examine the Legends of the West pane. It didn't take long for him to confirm that the picture was indeed of Ben Pickett and not his legendary uncle, Bill Pickett. Phillips presented his evidence to James Tolbert, the manager of Stamp Management.

The USPS made the decision to recall all the Legend panes and produce a new set featuring an authentic portrait of Bill Pickett. Stamp Ventures, the company responsible for printing the stamps, was instructed to halt operations. By that time, 5,201,000 panes had already been printed and distributed to 137 stamp distribution centers and 330 larger post offices. A recall order was issued to these locations.

== Official re-release by lottery ==
In an effort to address the demands of collectors and recoup the substantial printing costs amounting to $1.2 million, the USPS entered into a compromise with the Pickett family. As part of the agreement, it was assured that none of the erroneous sheets would be made available for sale. Subsequently, a controversial resolution was reached, wherein the USPS sold 150,000 recalled sheets through a lottery system at face value.
