= List of most expensive divorces =

Most expensive divorces

This is a list of the most expensive divorces in legal history. Amounts are given in U.S. dollars, and are not adjusted for inflation, unless explicitly stated so as a separate figure.

== Most expensive divorces ==
Person	Former spouse	Year	Length of marriage (years)	Settlement	Inflation adjusted	Notes
Bill Gates	Melinda Gates	2021		$76 billion	$88.8 billion	
Jeff Bezos	MacKenzie Bezos	2019		$38 billion	$47.9 billion	
Alec Wildenstein	Jocelyn Wildenstein	1999		$3.8 billion	$7.3 billion	
Rupert Murdoch	Anna dePeyster	1999		$1.7 billion	$3.3 billion	Estimated
Bill Gross	Sue	2017		$1.3 billion	$1.7 billion	Estimated
Bernie Ecclestone	Slavica	2009		$1.2 billion	$1.8 billion	Estimated
Steve Wynn	Elaine	2010		$1 billion	$1.5 billion	Estimated
Chey Tae-won	Roh Soh-yeong	2024		$1 billion		Approximate
Harold Hamm	Sue Ann Arnall	2012		$974.8 million	$1.4 billion	Estimated
Adnan Khashoggi	Soraya Khashoggi	1980	20	$874 million	$2.9 billion	Estimated
Mohammed bin Rashid Al Maktoum	Haya bint Hussein	2019	15	$730 million	$787 million	Estimated
Tiger Woods	Elin Nordegren	2010	5 or 6	$710 million	$1048 million	Estimated
Dmitry Rybolovlev	Elena	2014	26 or 27	$604 million	$820 million	Estimated
Craig McCaw	Wendy McCaw	1997	21	$460 million	$923 million	Estimated to exceed this amount
Mel Gibson	Robyn Moore Gibson	2006	26	$425 million	$679 million	Estimated
Robert L. Johnson	Sheila Johnson	2001	31 or 32	$400 million	$716 million	Estimated
Sergey Brin	Nicole Shanahan	2023	five	$360 million		At least this amount, based on SEC filings, with upward estimates up to $1 billion
Roman Abramovich	Irina Abramovich	2007	15 or 16	$300 million	$466 million	Estimated
Charles Edgar Fipke	Marlene Fipke	2000		$200 million	$374 million	Estimated
Invenergy's Michael Polsky	Maya Polsky	2007		$184 million	$286 million	
Michael Jordan	Juanita Jordan	2006	16 or 17	$168 million	$268 million	
Boris Berezovsky	Galina Besharova	2010	18 or 19	$160 million	$236 million	Estimated
Samathur Li Kin-kan	Florence Tsang Chiu-wing	2011	8	$157 million	$204 million	Estimated
Neil Diamond	Marcia Murphey	1994 or 1995	24, 25, or 26	$150 million	$326 or $317 million	Estimated
Frank McCourt	Jamie McCourt	2011	31 or 32	$130 million	$186 million	Estimated
Harrison Ford	Melissa Mathison	2004	20 or 21	$118 million	$201 million	Estimated
Greg Norman	Laura Andrassy	2007	25 or 26	$103 million	$160 million	Estimated
Steven Spielberg	Amy Irving	1989	3 or 4	$100 million	$260 million	Estimated
Chris Martin	Gwyneth Paltrow	2015	11 or 12	$100 million	$136 million	Estimated
Madonna	Guy Ritchie	2008	7 or 8	$76–$92 million	$114 or $138 million	Estimated
Dr Khoo Kay Peng	Pauline Chai	2017	46 or 47	$80 million	$105 million	Estimated
Kevin Costner	Cindy Silva	1994	15 or 16	$80 million	$174 million	Estimated
Aga Khan IV	Inaara Aga Khan	2011	12 or 13	$78 million	$112 million	Estimated
Kenny Rogers	Marianne Rogers	1993	15 or 16	$60 million	$134 million	Estimated
James Cameron	Linda Hamilton	1999	1 or 2	$50 million	$97 million	Estimated
Paul McCartney	Heather Mills	2008	5 or 6	$48.6 million	$73 million	Estimated
Phil Collins		2008		$45.7 million	$68 million	
Michael Douglas	Diandra Douglas	1995	17 or 18	$45 million	$95 million	Estimated
Ewan McGregor		2020				Half of his earnings over the past 20 years plus $432,000 per year spousal support and $180,000 per year child support
Ted Danson	Casey Coats	1993	15 or 16	$30 million	$67 million	Estimated
Donald Trump	Ivana Trump	1991	13 or 14	$25 million	$57 million	Estimated
Kelsey Grammer	Camille Grammer	2011	13 or 14	$30 million	$43 million	Estimated
Lionel Richie	Diane Richie	2004	8 or 9	$20 million	$34 million	Estimated
Johnny Carson	Joanna Holland	1985	12 or 13	$20 million	$60 million	Estimated
Mick Jagger	Jerry Hall	1999		$15–$25 million	$29 or $48 million	Common-law marriage voided; Estimated
Michael Jackson	Debbie Rowe	2000	3	$8.5 million	$16 million	Estimated
Slash	Perla Farrar	2014	12 or 13	$6.6 million	$9 million	Plus $100,000 per month spousal support and $39,000 per month child support
