= Bill H. Gross =

American billionaire

Bill Gross
- Born: William Hunt Gross; April 13, 1944 (age 82); Middletown, Ohio, U.S.
- Education: Duke University (BA); University of California, Los Angeles (MBA)
- Occupations: Investor, fund manager, and philanthropist
- Known for: Co-founder, PIMCO
- Spouses: Pamela Roberts (m. 1968, divorced) Sue Frank (m. 1985; div. 2017) Amy Schwartz (m. 2021)
- Children: 3, including Nick

William Hunt "Bill" Gross (born April 13, 1944) is an American investor and retired fund manager, who co-founded Pacific Investment Management Co. PIMCO is a global fixed income investment company. Gross ran their $270 billion Total Return Fund (PTTRX), before leaving to join Janus Capital Group (now Janus Henderson) in September 2014. Gross retired from active fund management in 2019.

== Early life and education ==
Gross was born in Middletown, Ohio, the son of Shirley (née Tait), a homemaker, and Sewell Mark Gross, a sales executive for AK Steel Holding. Part of his family is originally from Winnipeg, Canada. He was raised a Presbyterian. He moved with his parents to San Francisco in 1954. Gross graduated from Duke University in 1966 as an Angier B. Duke Scholar, and with a degree in psychology.

At Duke, he joined Phi Kappa Psi. He then served in the Navy from 1966 to 1969 as an assistant chief engineer aboard the USS Diachenko, leading several sorties of SEALs to landing sites along the coast of Vietnam. He left the Navy in 1970 with the Tet combat and Vietnam active service ribbons. Gross earned an MBA from the UCLA Anderson School of Management in 1971. Gross briefly played blackjack professionally in Las Vegas, Nevada, and has said that he applies many of his gambling methods for spreading risk and calculating odds to his investment decisions.

In 2019, Gross revealed his Asperger syndrome diagnosis.

== Investment career ==
Gross is a CFA Charterholder, who earned his credentials while working as an investment analyst for Pacific Mutual Life between 1971 and 1976.

Nicknamed the "Bond King" by Fortune magazine in 2002, Gross managed one of the world's largest mutual funds, focusing mostly on bonds and fixed income investments. Called "the nation's most prominent bond investor" by The New York Times, he co-founded Pacific Investment Management (PIMCO) and managed PIMCO's Total Return fund (once the world's largest bond fund with almost $293 billion in assets) and several smaller funds until his departure in September 2014.

At Pimco, Gross controlled more bond money than anyone in the world, and he advised the Treasury on the role of subprime mortgage bonds during the 2008 financial crisis. In naming Gross the Fund Manager of the Decade for fixed income in 2010, Morningstar said: "No other fund manager made more money for people than Bill Gross." He was known for boosting returns in his funds partly by using complex derivatives based on stocks, bonds, loans, and currencies. Ben Trosky, who created and ran Pimco's high-yield bond business from the 1990s through the early 2000s, told Barron's that Gross was "a good trader, a good analyst, and a good salesman, able to distill complex ideas into something simple and accessible".

Gross was able to beat the market for much of his career by exploiting the element of certainty, and mastering the element of uncertainty, according to a 2002 Fortune story, "The Bond King". Certainty for a bond investor like Gross included variables, such as credit ratings, yields, maturities, and duration, a measure of risk. The longer a bond's duration, the more wildly its price fluctuates when rates change, with cautious investors choosing shorter-term durations to limit price volatility caused by interest rate changes. Gross took advantage of uncertainty by making educated – but accurate – guesses on the direction of interest rates, inflation and other variables that affect bonds.

The Financial Times wrote in March 2019: "Active, aggressive bond investing was Gross' big innovation. Historically, insurers and pension funds were the big buyers of bonds. They rarely traded — in fact bonds were typically kept in a vault, and selling meant physically mailing them to the buyer — and enjoyed cordial, clubby relationships with Wall Street. Pimco, on the other hand, actively traded in and out of positions, expanded assertively into hot new areas like junk bonds and emerging markets, and used its increasing clout to cudgel banks into giving them better bids."

Following the collapse of Wall Street in 2008, Gross emerged as one of the nation's most influential financiers, and became among the most fervent supporters of the Obama administration's strategy (the Public-Private Investment Program, or P.P.I.P.) to enlist private investors to help bail out the nation's ailing banks and try to revive the economy.

It was widely reported that the departure of Pimco chief executive Mohamed El-Erian was triggered by conflict with Gross. Gross himself left late in the fall of 2014, and in October 2015 sued Pimco and parent company Allianz for "hundreds of millions of dollars", claiming that he had been pushed out by a "cabal" of executives "Driven by a lust for power, greed, and a desire to improve their own financial position and reputation at the expense of investors and decency", calling them out for "improper, dishonest, and unethical behavior". Pimco settled with Gross in March 2017 for a reported $81 million, all of which Gross pledged to donate to charity.

In the 1990s he authored two popular-market books on investing, Bill Gross on Investing and Everything You've Heard About Investing is Wrong! In September 2008, by holding large positions in agency-backed mortgage bonds of Fannie Mae and Freddie Mac, Gross's funds netted U.S. $1.7 billion after the federal takeover of Fannie Mae and Freddie Mac.

He announced his retirement from Janus Henderson Investors and active fund management in February 2019. He said at the time that he would focus on managing his personal assets and private charitable foundation, the $390 million-asset William, Jeff and Jennifer Gross Family Foundation.

== Personal life ==
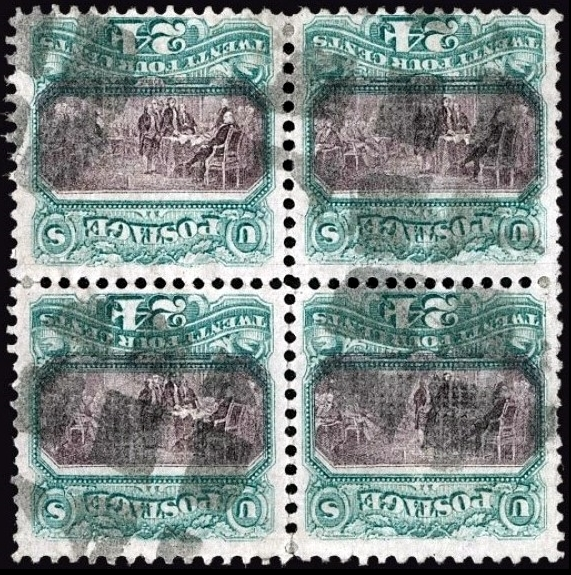
The block of four of the 1869 24c United States stamps with inverted centre from the Gross collection (shown inverted)

Gross has been married three times. In 1968, he married Pamela Roberts. They had two children: Jeff and Jennifer. They later divorced. In 1985, he married Sue J. Frank; they have one son, Nick. In 2018, they were involved in a contentious divorce. Both own homes in Laguna Beach, California.

Gross married former tennis professional Amy Schwartz in April 2021. She met Gross through a mutual friend in 2017, and they now live together in a Laguna Beach oceanfront mansion he bought for her, and which she decorated with a "love" theme. Named "Rockledge by the Sea" by a prior owner, the 10,000-square-foot home was the third-most-expensive home sale in 2018 in Orange County, California, at $32 million. The residence has 190 feet of ocean frontage, along with a private-access cove and beach. Gross threw a 50th birthday party for Schwartz at the house in September 2019, featuring singer-songwriter and guitarist Kenny Loggins. Schwartz credits Gross with renewing her interest in golf, which they frequently play together.

Gross has been diagnosed with Asperger syndrome and believes it has made him a "better investor". Gross is a prominent stamp collector.

As of November 2005, he became the third person (after Robert Zoellner in the 1990s and Benjamin K. Miller pre-1925) to form a complete collection of 19th century United States postage stamps. In October 2005, he purchased at auction for $2.97 million a unique plate block of the famous 1918 24-cent U.S. airmail stamps known as the "Inverted Jenny", featuring an engraving of a Curtiss JN-4 biplane printed upside-down. He then traded the Inverted Jenny plate block to Donald Sundman, president of Mystic Stamp Company, a stamp dealer, for a 1-cent 1868 "Z Grill" depicting Benjamin Franklin (one of only two known to exist), thus completing Gross's 19th-century collection. His collection will be auctioned over the next two to three years with the proceeds to be donated to charity. Prior auctions of Gross's Great Britain, British Commonwealth, Western Europe, Scandinavia, Confederate States, Switzerland and Hawaii stamp collections have generated more than $26 million in proceeds. What remains of Gross's collection — the United States stamps and covers – were scheduled to begin being auctioned with the sale of United States Stamp Treasures on October 3, 2018.

On October 3, 2018, Gross continued his formal exit from the market when Siegel Auction Galleries sold 106 of his pieces at the Lotte New York Palace hotel in New York City. The sale generated $10 million, breaking the $9.1 million record for a single-day stamp auction set in 2007. Continuing his tradition, Gross told Barron's that proceeds from the latest sale would go to Doctors Without Borders and the New York Times Neediest Cases, with more charities to be announced later.

Gross is well known as a passionate amateur golfer. In the foreword to former journalist David Rynecki's 2007 book, "Deals on the Green", Gross wrote golf was, "the most frustrating, damnable game ever conceived – alternately elevating and depressing you within the span of mere minutes. I love golf. No, I hate it." He has played in a foursome with Tiger Woods and other professionals at the AT&T Pro-Am at Pebble Beach, but wrote that even playing with Woods and earning tournament trophies, "can't compare to the exhilaration of the moment, the thrill of victory, and yes, the agony of missing a three-footer".

In 2014 Gross was reported as one of a number of "prominent investors [who] have taken to Transcendental Meditation".

Despite being a registered Republican, Gross donated to both the Barack Obama presidential campaign and the Democratic Senatorial Campaign Committee in 2008.

In October 2020, Gross and Schwartz sued their Laguna Beach neighbor Mark Towfiq, accusing him of developing an obsession with them, which included installing cameras directed at their property and "peeping tom behaviors". In a request for a temporary restraining order, Gross said he felt "trapped in my own home", and added, "Defendant Towfiq appears to have a particular fascination not only with Mr. Gross but also Ms. Schwartz, particularly when the pair are swimming and thus wearing minimal, if any, clothing." The lawsuit accused Towfiq of invasion of privacy, among other causes of action.

In a separate complaint filed after Gross and Schwartz's lawsuit, Towfiq accused the couple of harassing him by playing the theme from "Gilligan's Island" at loud volumes using outdoor speakers. According to Towfiq, the harassment began after he complained about a large Dale Chihuly statue on Gross' lawn that he said blocked his view even though the sculpture was installed against a side wall, which didn't block the view. In defense, Gross said that playing the theme from "Gilligan's Island" was not intended to be harassment, but that the song had special importance to him, while Schwartz contended that the artwork in question was so meaningful to her that she prayed to it. The Orange County Superior Court ultimately ordered Gross and Schwartz not to play music outdoors when they were not, themselves, outside.

== Wealth and philanthropy ==
In 2005, Gross donated $23.5 million to Duke University, $20 million of which was set aside for financial aid. In 2006, Gross donated to Doctors Without Borders/Médecins Sans Frontières the $9.1m that he earned from the auction at Shreves Philatelic Galleries of his British philatelic collections. Over the years, Gross has become the largest donor in history to Doctors Without Borders at approximately $25m. His Scandinavian and Finnish stamp collections were sold by Spink auction house in May 2008 to make a donation to the Jeffrey Sachs Millennium Villages Project at Columbia University. Gross also donated $20 million to Hoag Memorial Hospital Presbyterian for women's health and $10 million to the University of California, Irvine to fund a stem cell research center at its school of medicine.

In 2012, Gross donated $20 million to Cedars-Sinai Medical Center (Los Angeles) for the new Sue and Bill Gross Surgery and Procedure Center, which opened in summer 2013.

Also in 2013, Gross donated $20 million to Mercy Ships. This was designated to build a new hospital ship, the Global Mercy, to join the existing hospital ship, the Africa Mercy, in delivering medical services to the poor.

In 2016, Gross donated $40 million to the University of California, Irvine to establish a nursing school.

Named after its primary benefactor, the Smithsonian National Postal Museum's William H. Gross Stamp Gallery is the world's largest gallery dedicated to philately. Gross donated $8 million in 2009 to the National Postal Museum to create a 12,000-square-foot gallery. Portions of the donation came from the proceeds of Gross's sale of his collections of civil war and British North America postal history.

Gross formed the William, Jeff and Jennifer Gross Family Foundation in 2018 with his son and daughter from his first wife to coordinate his philanthropic activities. The foundation donates more than $20 million annually, and gave more than $1.5 million in 2020 for coronavirus relief efforts.

On Jan 26, 2020, Gross signed the Giving Pledge.

== Publications and works ==
- Bill Gross (1997). Everything You've Heard About Investing Is Wrong!. Crown Business. ISBN 0-8129-2839-3.
- Bill Gross (1998). Bill Gross on Investing. Wiley. ISBN 0-471-28325-8.
