= Robert Zoellner =

American philatelist (1932–2014)

Robert Emil Zoellner (April 26, 1932 – December 23, 2014) was an American investor and stamp collector who was the second person to have formed a complete collection of United States postage stamps, following Benjamin K. Miller, who had assembled a complete collection pre-1925.

== Life and work ==
Zoellner was born on April 26, 1932, in Irvington, New Jersey, to parents Emil John Zoellner and Anna Elizabeth Morton. Raised in what is now known as Elmwood Park, New Jersey (then East Paterson), Zoellner graduated from Lodi High School in 1950. He attended Lehigh University, where he graduated in 1954 with a bachelor's degree in electrical engineering and engineering physics and played on the school's hockey team. He was a member of Lehigh's Air Force Reserve Officer Training Corps program and served for two years in the United States Air Force after graduating from college.

Following his military service, Zoellner went into the investment field, establishing the firm of E.J. Roberts in 1958 before joining Edwards & Hanly, a firm that named him in 1964 as its managing partner. Together with his wife Victoria, he formed the investment firm Alpine Associates in 1976, which focuses on merger arbitrage, bankruptcy and other investment strategies. By the time of his death, the firm based in Englewood Cliffs, New Jersey, had $1.7 billion in assets under management and claimed never to have had a losing year since its establishment.

Zoellner had been a resident of Cresskill, New Jersey, where he donated funds to build tennis courts and a baseball field. He moved to nearby Alpine in the 1980s, where he was the borough's largest individual property owner, loaned heavy equipment to the borough's Department of Public Works and donated funds to the Alpine Public School District. Alpine mayor Paul Tomasko described Zoellner as "one of our foremost residents".

As a benefactor to Lehigh University, Zoellner and his wife contributed $6 million towards the construction of the Zoellner Arts Center and a physical science building. Zoellner had also contributed towards the establishment of a model train show held annually at the New York Botanical Garden.

Zoellner began collecting stamps as a child, but only began building his collection in earnest in 1985. He completed the collection in 1996 and it was auctioned off in 1998.

== Stamp collection ==
Like many philatelists, Zoellner collected stamps as a child and had attempted to fill his entire stamp album of United States stamps. However, many US stamps are quite rare, and he eventually put the album aside. His interest was rekindled in 1984, and in 1985 he approached Scott Trepel of Siegel Auctions and asked whether it was possible to assemble a complete collection. At the time all of the major grill rarities were coming on the market and Zoellner had both the "means and the inclination" (to quote the Weill brothers) to obtain them. He purchased the 1 cent Z grill, the rarest US stamp, in November 1986 for $418,000, setting a new record for a US stamp sale.

In addition to singles of each type, Zoellner also bought strips, blocks, and covers. Since his original album had no spaces for these, he moved to a system of computer-generated pages designed for the additional items.

By 1996, only a few spaces remained to be filled. Zoellner accepted an invitation to exhibit the collection at Anphilex '96 and scrambled to complete the collection. The last stamp he acquired was the 30c gray black stamp of 1873, given as a gift by one of Zoellner's friends.

On October 8–10, 1998, the entire collection was auctioned off. Siegel's auction catalog was a 391-page work that included extensive description and documentation of the items, many of which were the "finest known" of their type, and sold for prices well above their nominal values. The 1c Z grill went to Donald Sundman of Mystic Stamp Company for $935,000.

== References and sources ==
Sources

- United States Postage Stamps, The Robert Zoellner Collection (Siegel, 1998)
