= Benjamin K. Miller =

Benjamin K. Miller may refer to:

- Benjamin Kurtz Miller (1857–1928), Milwaukee attorney and philatelist
- Benjamin K. Miller (judge) (born 1938), justice of the Supreme Court of Illinois from 1984 to 2001
