= Mystic Stamp Company =

American stamp dealer

- Company type: Private
- Founded: 1923
- Founder: Lawrence K. Shaver (1923 – April 1, 1974)
- Successor: Maynard & Fannie Sundman (April 1, 1974); Donald & Chacea Sundman (until 2016); Employee-owned (2016 – present)
- Headquarters: Camden, New York
- Key people: Donald Sundman (president)
- Products: Postage Stamps; First Day Covers; Coins; Collecting Supplies
- Number of employees: 150
- Website: www.mysticstamp.com

Mystic Stamp Company is an American, employee-owned stamp dealer founded in 1923 by Lawrence K. Shaver (1903 – September 23, 1990). The company is headquartered where it was founded, in Camden, New York. It specializes in the buying and selling of postage stamps, collecting supplies, and other philatelic items.

== Company history ==
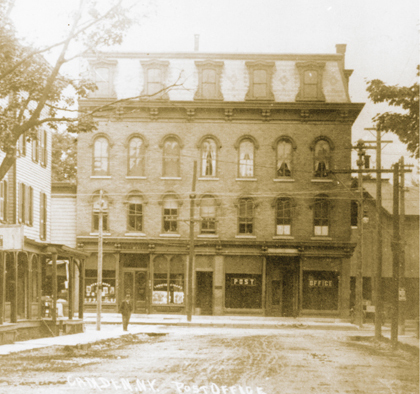
Mystic's first home over Camden's former Post Office building. The company began in one room and later expanded to three floors.

=== Lawrence K. Shaver ===
On May 26, 1923, H.E. Harris & Co. ran an advertisement in Mekeel's Weekly Stamp News inviting potential stamp dealers to invest $25 to $500 in order to make use of Harris' international wholesale supply network. Backed by his father, Lawrence "Larry" K. Shaver mailed H.E. Harris a check for $500.

Not long after sending his check, Shaver traveled to Boston, Massachusetts, to meet H.E. Harris in person. Harris asked him if he had a name for his new company yet, to which Shaver replied "No, I don't... do you have a suggestion, Mr. Harris?" Harris did have a suggestion: "I've always been intrigued by the naming of the Mystic River here." And so Mystic Stamp Company was born.

Over the years, with professional guidance from H.E. Harris, Shaver developed his stamp business. In 1973, Shaver was 70 years old and had been in business for 50 years. He decided it was time to retire and sell Mystic.

=== Maynard Sundman ===
In the early 1940s, Lawrence Shaver was on a visit to Boston to meet with H.E. Harris when he met Maynard Sundman for the first time. The two bonded over their love of stamps as well as for business. After World War II ended, the men struck up a professional friendship and rivalry. For many years, the two men had a weekly phone call to discuss changing trends in the advertising and sales world. They compared notes on how events like holidays or economic downturns affected their individual businesses, Shaver at Mystic and Sundman at Littleton Stamp Company in New Hampshire.

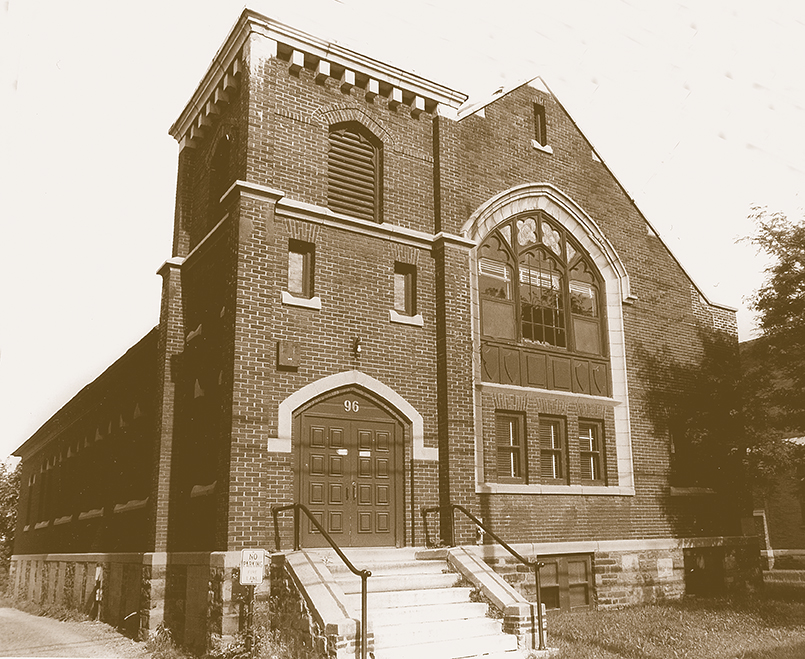
Mystic did business in this former church building from 1949 until 1989.

When it came time for Shaver to sell Mystic in 1973, he first turned to the recent buyers of the H.E. Harris Company, General Mills. But, the Federal Trade Commission had just filed an anti-trust lawsuit on General Mills for monopolizing the cereal business, and because of this they declined the deal.

The deal with Mystic fell through, and Shaver had to find another buyer.

Shaver rejected several offers to buy Mystic before he turned to Maynard Sundman in February 1974. The two men agreed to meet to discuss the idea. It didn't take long for them to come to an agreement, and the sale to Sundman was completed on April 1.

=== Donald Sundman ===
Since Maynard Sundman had Littleton Stamp Company to run already, he needed someone to manage Mystic in his stead. His son, 19-year-old Donald "Don" Sundman, was chosen for the venture. Don Sundman began as Mystic's general manager, and was named company president six years later in October 1980.

=== Employee Stock Ownership Plan (ESOP) ===
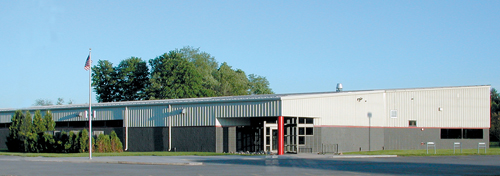
Mystic's current headquarters.

After several years under new ownership, Mystic outgrew its old location on Main Street in Camden. Work began on a new 20,000-square-foot facility (later expanded to 48,000 square feet) at 9700 Mill Street. The building was completed in July 1989, with the ribbon-cutting ceremony attended by the Sundman family as well as original owners Lawrence and Dorothy Shaver.

In 2016, Don Sundman and wife Chacea Sundman sold their company stock to an Employee Stock Ownership Plan (ESOP), making Mystic 100% employee-owned.

== Famous stamps ==
=== CIA Invert ===
In 1987, Mystic's name entered the news when Don Sundman helped break open the story of the famous 1979 invert of the $1 Candlestick stamp. Sundman did this by filing a request under the United States' Freedom of Information Act in which he requested all information about the stamps' origin from the Bureau of Engraving and Printing (BEP).

The stamp was the subject of a seminar at the 1987 APS Stamp Show. Don Sundman attended with his brother David Sundman. Discussions had reached a standstill when Don stood with his brown envelope from the BEP, stating "I think I have some new information here."

Don read the details of the BEP report aloud, revealing the now-famous stamp story to all in attendance, a decision that led to interviews with national television networks ABC, CBS, and NBC. It was after this that the stamp became known as the "CIA Invert."

Years later, in 1995, The American Philatelist published an article about the CIA Invert and Mystic's role in its story:

"A group of three younger investors – Mystic Stamp Company president Donald Sundman, Dana Oakey, and Mark Morrow – gambled that the stamp would remain rare and desirable and bought fifty of the stamps from Schiff in two lots of twenty-five. Sundman donated one of his stamps to the Smithsonian Institution. He then filed a request under the federal Freedom of Information Act for all information on the stamps' origin in the files of the Bureau of Engraving and Printing."

=== 1868 1¢ Z-Grill ===
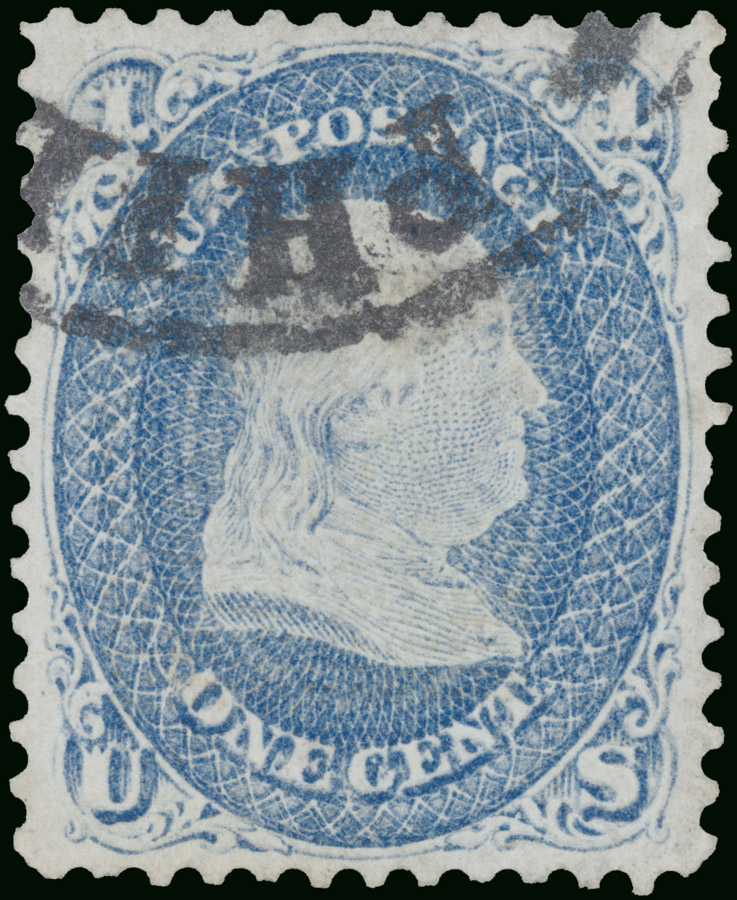
1¢ Z Grill, previously owned by Mystic.

In October 1998, Don Sundman and his son Zachary attended a Robert A. Siegel auction of the Robert Zoellner Collection and bought the extremely rare 1868 1¢ Z Grill (only two copies are known to exist). Zachary, then just 11 years old, held the winning paddle. The auction closed at $935,000, setting a record price paid for a US stamp at the time. Valued at $3 million, the stamp is the finest 1¢ Z Grill known and the only one available to collectors (the other is locked away in the New York Public Library's Miller Collection).

Don Sundman later said of acquiring the rare stamp:

"I could not believe my luck in buying the Z Grill in 1998 because other people had far more money than I did, but were not willing to pay it for the stamp. I'm so lucky. At the time, I used the analogy that the Z Grill to Mystic was what Michael Jordan was to Nike. The Z Grill could be our celebrity."

=== 1918 Jenny Invert Plate-Number Block ===
On November 2, 2005, Don Sundman traded the 1868 1¢ Z Grill with well-known bond fund manager and stamp collector Bill Gross for his 1918 Jenny Invert Plate-Number Block. The trade made national news with headlines like "Blockbuster Stamp Swap Worth Millions" (ABC News). Sundman later spoke about the trade and his feelings about both major stamp rarities:

"I traded the 1¢ Z Grill for the Jenny Invert Plate-Number Block because it sounded like it would be fun. It was also the only way to guarantee Mystic would own the two best US stamp rarities.

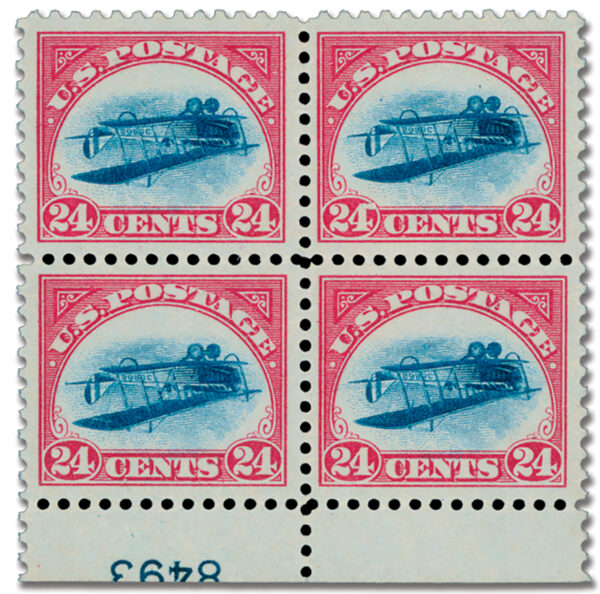
Jenny Invert Plate-Number Block previously owned by Mystic.

I loved buying, owning, and exhibiting the 1¢ Z Grill Mystic purchased in 1998... From time to time, collectors offered to buy the stamp. I rejected their offers... It was the only stamp Mystic owned that was not for sale.

In the fall of 2005, the stamp press reported the news that the owner of the unique Jenny Plate-Number Block would auction the block in October. Mr. [Charles] Shreve offered me a unique proposition – if his client acquired the Jenny Plate-Number Block, would I trade the Z Grill for it? The Jenny Plate-Number Block is a fantastic rarity. I first saw it at the 1976 International Stamp Exposition in Philadelphia. Every collector and millions of non-collectors know the stamp, but few have seen the Plate-Number Block...

A trade of the two world's most valuable items by weight would be historic, fun, and make a great story for stamp collectors everywhere. Despite this, I turned down the offer because of my enjoyment of possessing the Z Grill and because I had committed to lending the stamp to the Smithsonian National Postal Museum starting in June 2006. When told of my decision, Mr. Shreve's client generously offered to honor my commitment to lend the Z Grill to the NPM. It was then that I agreed to the trade.

Today, I'm thrilled to have been able to trade our 1¢ Z Grill for the Jenny Plate-Number Block. As a boyhood collector, the Jenny Invert was one of the rare stamps I fantasized of owning. With this trade, those fantasies became fact and I had the special privilege of owning the two best and most valuable United States philatelic objects. At the trade itself I experienced a positive feeling of excitement, almost an electric sensation... I'm proud of the positive attention the trade brought to philately."

In 2014, Mystic sold the Jenny Invert Plate-Number Block to famed shoe designer Stuart Weitzman for about $5 million.

=== Confederate Printing Press No. 3 ===
During the American Civil War, the printing firm Hoyer & Ludwig was chosen to produce the first Confederate postage stamps. The hand-press known as No. 3 was used to print the stamps using lithography. To print, a lithographic stone was placed on the bed of the printer, moistened with water, inked, and covered with paper. The stone was then run through the press and past a blade, which pressed the stamp images onto the paper.

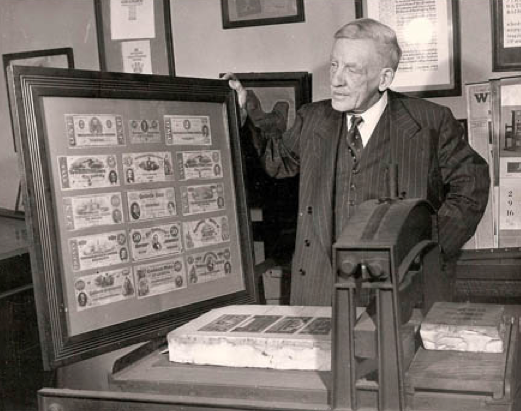
August Dietz with Confederate Printing Press No. 3 (now on display at Mystic)

Hoyer & Ludwig went out of business at the end of the Civil War, selling out to Simons & Keiningham, who later sold their equipment to A. Hoen & Company – including Press. No. 3. After a fire destroyed their headquarters, Hudson P. Hoen gave the press to former Hoyer & Ludwig apprentice (and Confederate stamp expert) August Dietz.

Confederate Press No. 3 remained in Dietz's family long after his 1963 death. It was displayed at the Dietz Printing Company for several years and even loaned to the Smithsonian Museum of American History, VAPEX 1975, and the APS Stamp Show in Richmond, Virginia.

Over 100 years after Dietz acquired Press No. 3, his heirs put it up for auction, where it was bid on and successfully won by Mystic President Don Sundman. The 1,000-pound cast iron press, along with four lithographic stones, made its way to Mystic's headquarters in Camden, NY, where it remains on display to this day.

== First day cover business ==
=== Mystic ===
Mystic produced its first First Day Cover in 1992 and continued making covers until 2007, when it acquired Fleetwood.

=== Fleetwood ===
Fleetwood produced First Day Covers from 1941 until 2007 when it was purchased by Mystic. Mystic discontinued their own brand of First Day Covers and continued producing Fleetwood First Day Covers instead.

=== Colorano ===
In early 2016, Mystic purchased the Colorano company known for its First Day Covers featuring silk cachets.

Silk cachets are a type of decorative element found on first day covers (FDCs), which are envelopes or postal cards that commemorate the issuance of a new postage stamp on its first day of release. The cachet is an artistic design or illustration printed or embossed on the cover, typically related to the stamp's theme or subject matter.

Silk cachets differ from other types of cachets because they incorporate actual silk fabric into their design. Instead of using paper or cardstock, a piece of silk material is affixed to the cover, either as a patch or as part of the overall artwork. The silk may be plain or dyed in various colors to enhance the visual appeal of the cachet, adding a touch of elegance and luxury.

Colorano was in business for 40 years before owner Jim Roselle sold to Mystic.

=== ArtCraft ===
ArtCraft was a First Day Cover producer from 1939 until 2015 when they began selling Fleetwood First Day Covers. When ArtCraft closed its doors in 2019, Mystic bought their complete inventory of over 5 million covers. ArtCraft covers are known for their steel-engraving-style cachets.

== See also ==
- Stamp Collecting
- Henry Ellis Harris
- Littleton Coin Company
