= Littleton Coin Company =

Mail-order coin company

- Type: Private
- Founded: 1945; 81 years ago
- Founder: Maynard & Fannie Sundman
- Headquarters: Littleton, New Hampshire
- Key people: David Sundman (president)
- Products: Coins, Paper Money, Coin Supplies
- Revenue: $50 million (2017 est.)
- Number of employees: 315 (2017)
- Website: www.littletoncoin.com

Littleton Coin Company is an employee-owned privately held major American mail order and retail company focused on numismatic (currency) collectibles and based in Littleton, New Hampshire. The company focuses largely on U.S. coins and world coins, as well as a variety of paper money and ancient coins. Largely focused on direct mail, Littleton publishes catalogs several times yearly and has a "coins-on-approval" program.

== Company history ==
=== Biographical background ===
As is the case with many numismatic firms, the history of the Littleton Coin Company is part and parcel of the biography of an individual. Company founder F. Maynard Sundman was born October 17, 1915, in New Britain, Connecticut, the only child of a couple living on a 3.5 acres (1.4 ha) farm located just northeast of that town. Sundman's paternal grandfather and grandmother had emigrated to the United States from Sweden and Norway, respectively. His grandfather worked as a foreman in a lock factory, his grandmother a committed gardener and homemaker. Both were deeply important to Maynard Sundman during his formative years.

About 1927 or 1928, when Maynard was a boy of 12, he was captivated by the postage stamp collection of a young friend. Sundman began to build a collection of his own, purchasing stamps by mail order from the Herbert A. Kegwin Company of Middletown, New York, one of about 50 American philatelic retailers of the day. His collecting interest spread and Sundman was soon subscribing to Mekeel's Weekly Stamp News, a publication which gradually taught him the mechanics of mail order "approval sales," in which customers were periodically provided with numerous groups of stamps for sale. The recipient would then select the lots desired, returning the bulk of the consignment with payment. This would prove to be the business model use by Sundman and his Littleton Coin Company in later years.

In 1929 Sundman's interest in retail selling was further piqued by his first exposure to H.E. Harris & Co., the successful philatelic mail order operation run by Henry Ellis Harris — who had himself begun in the stamp business as a boy of 14. Sundman began to dream of following in Harris's footsteps as a successful entrepreneur dealing in the collector market.

Sundman graduated from Bristol High School in 1935 and set about entering the mail order stamp trade. Having accumulated a nest egg of $400 — a considerable sum during the Great Depression — Sundman wrote directly to H.E. Harris to obtain a wholesale catalog. Additional dealer inventory was purchased from Held Brothers in New York City. An initial advertisement was placed in the August 17, 1935, issue of Stamps Magazine, with Sundman doing business in his own name as the "Maynard Sundman Stamp Company" rather than as less descript corporate entity.

Sundman's initial efforts at approval selling proved successful and in July 1936 he was advanced a $50 line of credit by H.E. Harris & Co., the beginning of a close business relationship which would run into the millions of dollars over the next four decades. Backed by Harris's expanding credit line for provision of wholesale stamps, Sundman's business grew dramatically. By June 1939 the 23-year-old entrepreneur presided over a company with 4 employees, who dealt with 500 new prospective customers per week. The firm built its growing customer list through a steady stream of advertisements placed in the popular press, including such magazines as Boys' Life, Popular Mechanics, Popular Science, and in the back of comic books.

In April 1941 the young stamp mogul married the former Felicia Dorothy Kasper, known to her friends as "Fannie." The couple remained together for over half a century, raising children who later worked in the family business.

The coming of World War II interrupted Sundman's best-laid plans, and he was drafted into the American military during the summer of 1941, ordered to report for training early in September of that year. A difficult decision was made and the stamp-selling enterprise was shut down for the duration of the war. The lucrative customer list was transferred in exchange for a 10% commission paid to Sundman on sales made to people on the list. These funds allowed the debt to H.E. Harris & Co. to be largely or completely liquidated.

=== Establishment ===
Sundman was honorably discharged from the military in October 1945, having served as a military policeman in Northern Africa and Italy. He returned to New England intent upon resuming business as a stamp dealer. Together with his wife Fannie the Sundmans obtained a lease of a building in the small town of Littleton, New Hampshire to headquarter a new venture, to be known as the Littleton Stamp Company. H.E. Harris would again prove instrumental in Sundman's success, this time allowing his 30-year-old protégé and business associate carte blanch access to his company's wholesale inventory, with an initial dealer inventory advanced to Sundman valued just in excess of $25,000.

Littleton was chosen in part due to its post office, which was large and efficient for a town of Littleton's size. This aspect of infrastructure was rightfully considered by the Sundmans to be of pivotal importance for their future mail order operation. Several decades later, between catalogs, approvals, and correspondence Sundman's Littleton Stamp and Coin Company generated upwards of 2 million pieces of mail per year.

Business commenced in December 1945, with the first advertising placed in four mainstream popular magazines. H.E. Harris himself wrote the advertising copy for the first Littleton Stamp Company ad, which promised "Double your money back if not delighted!" to purchasers of a packet of airmail stamps costing 10 cents. Sales the first month amounted to less than $800 — a total which nearly tripled by the third month of business as the mailing list grew and repeat business began to flow in.

As the Littleton Stamp Company grew, so too did the Sundman family through the birth of three sons: David Sundman (born 1948), Frederick "Rick" Sundman (born 1950), and Donald "Don" Sundman (born 1954). All three sons would eventually work in managerial capacities in the burgeoning family business, with David and Rick concentrating on numismatics and Don eventually heading philatelic operations after the 1974 acquisition of the Mystic Stamp Company.

Littleton's growth was bolstered by the close personal friendship and business relationship between Sundman and H.E. Harris, with Harris maintaining confidence and trust even as the credit balance on wholesale inventory topped the $200,000 mark in the early 1950s. The company's mailing list and sales volume continued to expand, however, until ultimately the Harris line of credit was paid down in full.

As was the case with other prominent stamp dealers of the day, during the first postwar years when Littleton Stamp was beginning to be established business was dominated by sales to boys and girls — the so-called "juvenile trade." In later years, with the growth of television, the ready availability of transportation, and the expansion of team sports, demographics of the trade shifted somewhat as children were presented with additional recreational opportunities.

Sundman and Littleton moved from a concentration upon advertising in magazines targeted to a young male readership to ads in the Sunday supplements inserted into mass circulation newspapers, with one particularly successful campaign which offered 10 free Bohemia-Moravia stamps depicting Adolf Hitler ultimately distributing half a million sets, boosting the company's mailing list, and cementing Littleton's place as one of the "Big Five" American stamp dealers of the day.

=== Entry into numismatics ===
By 1954 the Littleton Stamp Company had grown to an operation of sufficient scope to employ 60 people, with fully 99% of the company's business done through the sale of postage stamps. Gradually an awareness developed of the parallel potential of the numismatic market, with the collectors of these items being greatly similar in disposition. Littleton began testing the water with the sale of coins and banknotes, employing the same essential approval sales business model based upon mass circulation advertising which had worked so successfully for stamp dealers for decades.

Initial marketing efforts were rewarded and the decision was made to expand numismatic operations, with the company's name changed to Littleton Stamp & Coin Company later in 1954 to help spur sales in this new field of endeavor.

Littleton Stamp and Coin continued in its company tradition of placing primary emphasis of creating and developing new collectors, making use of advertising in a broad range of mass-circulation magazines and newspapers not traditionally mined by sellers of collectibles. Littleton effectively pioneered the approval method of mail order selling which had been long established in philatelics to the world of numismatics, sending out coins for review, to be either purchased or returned — with no credit card requirement to guarantee the company's safety in the transaction.

While the approval system sometimes provoked an incredulous reaction by those unfamiliar with the sales method, the company has indicated that over time the vast majority of those receiving such approval lots have proven honest in fulfilling the terms of the arrangement, with fewer than 10% of approval recipients proving problematic.

Gradually sales of coins and banknotes began to catch up with the company's sales of stamps until sometime in the middle 1970s a tipping point was reached and numismatic sales volume began to exceed philatelic sales volume.

=== Mystic acquisition ===
In 1974, Maynard and Fannie Sundman purchased a long-time rival, the Mystic Stamp Company of Camden, New York. The couple's youngest son, Don, was placed in charge of the newly acquired operation. All remaining philatelic operations were transferred from Littleton, New Hampshire, to New York at the time of the acquisition, with the New Hampshire operation subsequently strictly focused upon coin sales under a new name — the Littleton Coin Company.

A frenetic boom of precious metal prices and interest in coins for investment purposes in the late 1970s led to a bubble in the numismatic market as an anxious public sought a safe harbor for its investments in a time of rampant inflation in the United States. Littleton Coin Company briefly entered the rare coin market in this interval, attempting to bring a new crop of investor-collectors into its customer base. A short-lived subdivision called "Littleton Rare Coins" was launched.

This decision was ultimately regarded as a mistake, however, as a crash of metal prices in the early 1980s deflated the coin collecting boom and led to a mass exodus of the casual investor crowd. Littleton returned to its roots as a vendor of generally low ticket-price items to collecting hobbyists.

In 1985, David Sundman was named President of the Littleton Coin Company.

=== Company today ===
Company founder Maynard Sundman died on October 31, 2007, at the age of 92.

As of 2012, Littleton Coin Co. employed approximately 370 people at its Littleton, NH, facility. The company's operations are centralized in a single 85,000-square-foot (7,900 m^{2}) facility.

In 2017, owner David Sundman sold the family's stock in the company to Littleton's 315 employees after his children expressed no interest in carrying on the family business.

== See also ==
- Coin collecting
- Mystic Stamp Company
