= Inverted Jenny =

American postage stamp with design error

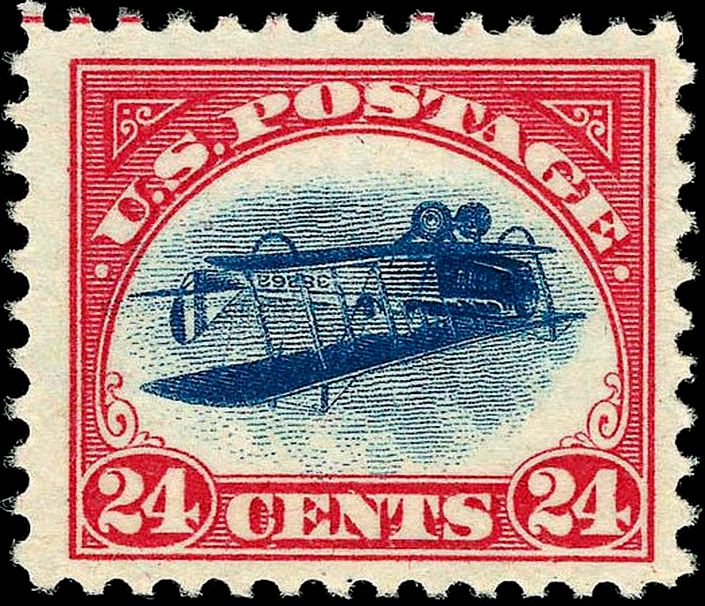
- Country of production: United States
- Date of production: May 10, 1918
- Depicts: Curtiss JN-4
- Nature of rarity: Invert error
- No. in existence: 100
- Face value: 24 US¢
- Estimated value: US $1,593,000

The Inverted Jenny (also known as an Upside Down Jenny, Jenny Invert) is a 24 cent United States postage stamp first issued on May 10, 1918, in which the image of the Curtiss JN-4 airplane in the center of the design is printed upside-down; it is one of the most famous errors in American philately. Only one pane of 100 of the invert stamps was ever found, making this error one of the most prized in philately.

A single Inverted Jenny was sold at a Robert A. Siegel auction in November 2007 for $977,500. In December 2007 a mint never hinged example was sold for $825,000. The broker of the sale said the buyer was a Wall Street executive who had lost the auction the previous month. A block of four Inverted Jennys was sold at a Robert A. Siegel auction in October 2005 for $2.7 million. During the 2008 financial crisis, prices fetched by Inverted Jennys receded. Between January and September 2014, five examples offered at auction sold for sums ranging from $126,000 through $575,100. Prices eventually recovered, for on May 31, 2016, a particularly well-centered Jenny invert, graded XF-superb 95 by Professional Stamp Experts, was sold at a Siegel Auction for a hammer price of $1,175,000 The addition of a 15% buyer's premium raised the total record high price paid for this copy to $1,351,250. On 15 November 2018, the recently discovered position number 49 stamp was auctioned by Robert A. Siegel Auction Galleries for a hammer price of $1,350,000, with an 18 percent buyer's premium raising the total cost to $1,593,000.

On 11 November 2023, another Inverted Jenny stamp was auctioned by Robert A. Siegel Auction Galleries for a new record hammer price of $1,700,000, with an 18% buyer’s premium raising the total cost to $2,006,000.

== Background ==
During the 1910s, the United States Post Office made a number of experimental trials of carrying mail by air. These were shown by the first stamp in the world to picture an airplane (captioned as "aeroplane carrying mail"), one of the U.S. Parcel Post stamps of 1912–13. The Post Office finally decided to inaugurate regular service on May 15, 1918, flying between Washington, D.C., Philadelphia, and New York City. The Post Office set a controversial rate of 24 cents for the service, much higher than the 3 cents for first-class mail of the time. The postage had a value equivalent to $5.14 in 2025. The Post Office decided to issue a new stamp just for this rate, patriotically printed in red and blue, and depicting a Curtiss Jenny JN-4HM, the biplane especially modified for shuttling the mail. The stamp's designer, Clair Aubrey Huston, apparently troubled to procure a photograph of that modified model (produced by removing the second pilot seat from the JN-4HT to create space for mailbags, and by increasing the fuel capacity). As only six such aircraft existed, there was a 1-in-6 chance that the very plane engraved on the stamp by Marcus Baldwin—Jenny #38262—would be chosen to launch the inaugural three-city airmail run; the plane on the stamp was indeed the first to depart from Washington on May 15, taking off at 11:47 a.m.

The job of designing and printing the new stamp was carried out in a great rush; engraving began only on May 4, and stamp printing on May 10 (a Friday), in sheets of 100 (contrary to the usual practice of printing 400 at a time and cutting into 100-stamp panes). Since the stamp was printed in two colors, each sheet had to be placed into the flat-bed printing press twice, an error-prone process that had resulted in invert errors in stamps of 1869 and 1901, and at least three misprinted sheets were found during the production process and destroyed. It is believed that only one misprinted pane of 100 stamps got through unnoticed.

Many collectors long thought the blue plane portion was printed first, thus it was actually the red frames that were inverted. In fact, the frames were printed first and it is the planes that are upside down. In examples where the plane is so far off center that it overlaps the frames, it can be seen that the blue ink used to print the plane lies atop the red ink used to print the frames. The Smithsonian's National Postal Museum offers two explanations for how this might have occurred: either a sheet of printed frames was placed in the press upside down for the printing of the plane; or the printing plate used to print the planes was mounted inverted within the printing press.

Initial deliveries went to post offices on Monday, May 13. Aware of the potential for inverts, a number of collectors went to their local post offices to buy the new stamps and keep an eye out for errors. Collector William T. Robey was one of those; he had written to a friend on May 10 mentioning: “It might interest you to know that there are two parts to the design, one an insert into the other, like the Pan-American issues. I think it would pay to be on the lookout for inverts on account of this.” On May 14, Robey went to the post office to buy the new stamps, and as he wrote later, when the clerk brought out a sheet of inverts, "my heart stood still". He paid for the sheet, and asked to see more, but the remainder of the sheets were normal. The postal clerk who sold the sheet later said he did not realize the image was inverted because he had never seen an airplane before.

Additional details of the day's events are not entirely certain—Robey gave three different accounts later—but he began to contact both stamp dealers and journalists, to tell them of his find. After a week that included visits from postal inspectors who tried to buy it back, and the hiding of the sheet under his mattress, Robey sold the sheet to noted Philadelphia dealer Eugene Klein for $15,000. Klein placed an advertisement on the first page of the May 25, 1918 Mekeel’s Weekly Stamp News offering to sell copies of the invert ($250 for fully perforated examples, $175 for stamps with one straight edge), but announced in his following week's ad that the entire sheet had been purchased by an individual collector. The buyer, who paid $20,000, was "Colonel" Edward Green, son of Hetty Green.

Klein advised Green that the stamps would be worth more separately than as a single sheet, and Green went along. He donated one invert (which was auctioned off for $300) to the Red Cross in support of its war efforts, while retaining forty-one of the stamps in his own collection, including the plate-number block (initially eight stamps) and several blocks of four. The remainder of the inverts were sold off at steadily increasing prices through Klein, who kept a block of four for himself. Green had one copy placed in a locket for his wife. This gold and glass locket displayed the inverted Jenny on one side, and a "regular" Jenny stamp on the other. This locket was offered for sale for the first time on May 18, 2002, in the Siegel Auction Galleries Rarity Sale. It did not sell in the auction, but the philatelic press reported that a Private Treaty sale was arranged later for an unknown price.

The philatelic literature has long stated that seven of the stamps have been lost or destroyed through theft or mishandling. However, in 2007 a copy came to light that had not been seen since Eugene Klein broke up the sheet, and was offered for auction that June. Several others have been damaged, including one that was sucked into a vacuum cleaner. Apparently Green's wife mailed one which, while recovered, is the only cancelled sample. Indeed, no Jenny invert is in pristine condition, because Klein lightly penciled a number on the back of each stamp (from 1 through 10 in the top row to 91 through 100 in the bottom row) so that its original position on the sheet could be identified. For many years, only five examples were known to have survived in never-hinged condition. One of these is the locket copy, which, however has another condition problem: a corner crease at the bottom right probably caused while it was being enclosed behind glass.

== A famous stamp ==
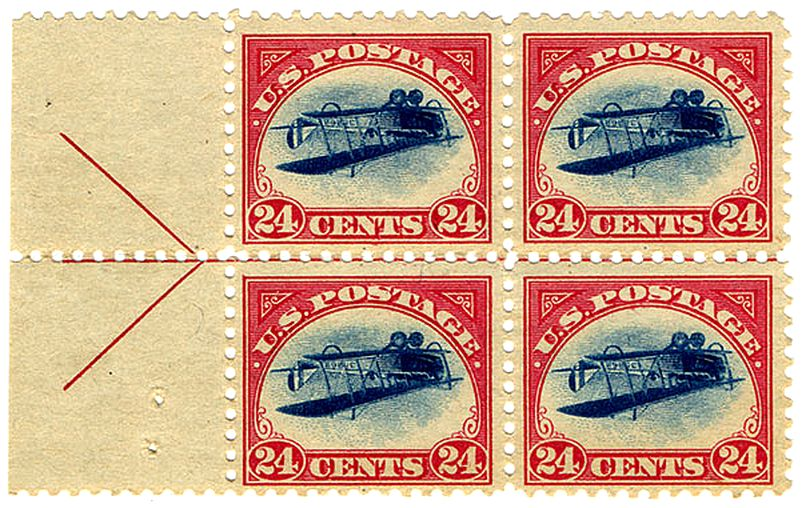
Inverted Jenny, 1918 issue, block of four, with center-line arrow at left

Aside from having the biplane printed upside down, the inverted Jenny has become famous for other reasons as well. Benjamin Kurtz Miller, one of the early buyers of these inverts, 10 in all, bought the stamp for $250. Miller's inverted Jenny, position 18 on the sheet, was stolen in 1977 but was recovered in the early 1980s though, unfortunately, the top perforations had been cut off to prevent it from being recognized as the stolen Miller stamp. This mutilation made the stamp appear as if it had come from the top row of the sheet, and Klein's numbering on the back was accordingly tampered with to disguise the stamp as position 9—an astute piece of misdirection founded in the knowledge that position 9 had never appeared on the market: in fact, the real position 9 emerged decades later as the locket copy. (A genuine straight-edged copy would have cost Miller only $175.) However, that stolen and missing stamp served to drive the value of the other 99 examples even higher. That inverted Jenny was the main attraction in the Smithsonian National Postal Museum's 'Rarity Revealed' exhibition, 2007–2009. The "Inverted Jenny" was the most requested postage stamp for viewing by visitors at the museum.

In 2014, the mass media renewed long-dormant public attention to the 1955 theft of an even more spectacular Jenny specimen. This was a block of four (positions 65, 66, 75, 76) with a vertical red guide-line through its center, owned by the collector Ethel McCoy, which was stolen from a stamp show at a Norfolk hotel where it was being exhibited. The top right stamp from this block has never been found; the two left stamps surfaced in the 1970s as single copies offered in auction catalogues and were recovered by the FBI, although they had been camouflaged by minor mutilation: the portions of the right-edge perforations on which parts of the guide line were originally visible had been trimmed off or abraded to remove the red ink. McCoy's will had made the American Philatelic Research Library the legal owner of all four stamps in the block. In 2014 Donald Sundman of the Mystic Stamp Company offered $100,000 in reward money—$50,000 for the two stamps that were still missing—to anyone who could bring them to their rightful owner. The offer was publicized in The New York Times and on national network news.

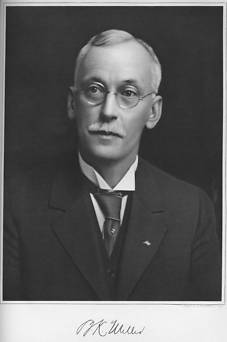
Benjamin K. Miller, whose Inverted Jenny stamp was stolen in 1977

In April 2016, a third stamp from the stolen McCoy block turned up for auction at the Spink USA auction house. The seller was a British citizen in his 20s who claimed to have inherited it from his grandfather and knew little about the stamp's provenance. Examination revealed that the stamp came from position 76 in the pane of 100. The American Philatelic Research Library said it will work to take possession of the stamp once an FBI investigation is complete and other legal matters settled. The only stamp that remains missing is position 66.

Philatelic forgers have mutilated at least four additional Inverted Jennys, (positions 4, 5, 6 and 8) disfiguring them with false perforations at the top (these were copies from the first horizontal row of the sheet, all of which originally had a straight edge at the top. The spurious perforations on position 4 have been trimmed away, but traces of them are still discernable along the narrow margin that remains).

In 2019, the 31-year-old musician son of "Bond King" Bill Gross auctioned off a set of five highly valued stamps, including an Inverted Jenny, for a total of $1.9 million, against his father's wishes. His father reportedly claims that he himself gave each of his three kids some priceless "Jennys" seven years earlier, on the condition that his grandchildren ultimately inherit them. A more recent sale was in March 2020, when a Jenny (position 95) was sold to collector Trevor Fried in Fort Lauderdale, Florida.

On November 15, 2023 an inverted Jenny stamp was sold to a collector, Charles Hack, at a New York Auction for two-million dollars, the highest bid ever made on this rarity. In 1982 the Scott catalogue value for a single invert was $145,000.

The Jenny invert is so famous in the philatelic community—and the general public as well—that the complete history of all sales has been publicly documented.

== A rare swap ==
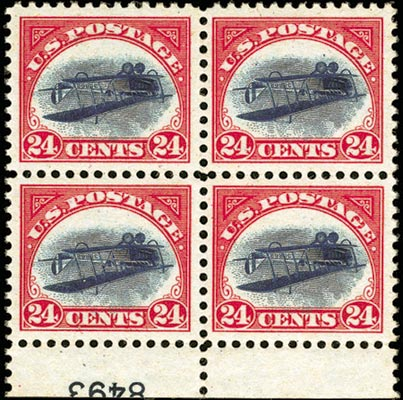
The Inverted Jenny plate block of four (note that the blue plate number is inverted as well). As of June 2015, it was owned by shoe designer and collector Stuart Weitzman.

At an auction of the Green estate in 1944, the unique plate number block of eight stamps was sold for $27,000 to the collector Amos Eno, who had four stamps removed from it. The reduced block fetched only $18,250 when Eno's estate was sold off ten years later. By 1971, however, its price had risen to $150,000. Eventually, in late October 2005 this plate number block of four stamps was purchased by a then-anonymous buyer for $2,970,000. The purchaser was revealed to be U.S. financier Bill Gross. Shortly after purchasing the Inverted Jennys he proceeded to trade them with Donald Sundman, president of the Mystic Stamp Company, a stamp dealer, for one of only two known examples of the USA 1c Z Grill. By completing this trade, Gross became the owner of the only complete collection of U.S. 19th century stamps.

== 2006 forgery ==
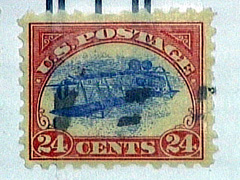
The forgery on cover

In November 2006, election workers in Broward County, Florida, claimed to have found an Inverted Jenny affixed to an absentee ballot envelope. The sender did not include any identification with the ballot, which automatically disqualified the ballot. Peter Mastrangelo, executive director of the American Philatelic Society, observed that the stamp was at variance with known copies, due in part to its perforations, although the colors had been reproduced accurately. Further investigations, published in the following month, confirmed that the stamp was a forgery.

== 95th anniversary souvenir sheet ==
On September 22, 2013, the United States Postal Service issued a souvenir sheet illustrating six examples of the inverted stamp denominated $2 instead of the original 24 cents. The sheets were sold at face value, $12 (the issue was sold only as souvenir sheets of six, and not as individual $2 stamps). Various special packagings for collectors were also offered for a premium.

In addition to the 2.2 million sheets printed with the plane inverted, the Postal Service announced it also printed 100 "non-inverted Jenny" souvenir sheets, with the plane flying right side up. All sheets are individually wrapped in sealed envelopes to recreate the excitement of finding an Inverted Jenny when opening the envelope and to avoid the possibility of discovering a corrected Jenny prior to purchase. Individuals purchasing one of the 100 non-inverted Jenny sheets find a congratulatory note inside the wrapping asking them to call a phone number to receive a certificate of acknowledgement signed by Postmaster General Patrick Donahoe. A non-inverted sheet purchased by Gail and David Robinson of Richmond, Virginia, was sold in June 2014 by Siegel Auctions "Rarities of the World" for $51,750, with the 15% buyer's premium.

In 2015 the Postal Service's Inspector General called the issuing of a few right side up Jenny airmail sheets improper because regulations do not allow the deliberate creation and distribution of stamp errors. The Service's general counsel was aware of the plan but formal approval by the legal department did not occur. It was also found that the Service's stamp fulfillment center in Missouri had accidentally failed to distribute 23 of the 30 sheets it was supposed to randomly mix in with orders (the other 70 went to local post offices). Thus not even the promised 100 were made available to the public.

== StampWants giveaway ==
As covered in Linn's Stamp News, on January 12, 2008, StampWants.com (an online marketplace for stamps, now known as bidStart.com) gave away an inverted Jenny, after a year-long promotion the company ran. This represented the most expensive stamp ever given away in any sort of promotion. The winner of the giveaway was John Shedlock, of California, and the stamp was presented to him by the then-current Miss New Jersey, Amy Polumbo.

== Position 49 stamp located after missing for 100 years ==
On September 6, 2018, The New York Times reported that the Philatelic Foundation had authenticated an inverted Jenny stamp that had not been seen since the original sheet of 100 was divided in 1918. It is a sixth never-hinged copy, the long-missing Jenny at position No. 49. On 15 November 2018, the stamp was auctioned by Robert A. Siegel Auction Galleries for the then-record sum of $1,593,000 (including the 18 percent buyer's premium).

== In popular culture ==
The Inverted Jenny appears in several TV shows and films, including the 1985 film Brewster's Millions, the 1993 episode "Homer's Barbershop Quartet" of the animated TV series The Simpsons, the Foyle's War episode "The Eternity Ring", and the 2019 episode "One Big Happy Family" of the legal drama For the People. The 2024 song "Invert the Jenny" by Sarah and the Safe Word is themed around the stamp. While it is not named, Donald Duck finds a 24 US¢ inverted-biplane airmail error stamp, described as the rarest American stamp, in the story "The Money Pit".

== See also ==
- Airmails of the United States
- List of United States airmail stamps
- CIA invert
- Invert error
- List of most expensive philatelic items
- List of notable postage stamps
- Philatelic investment
- Stamp collecting
- Pan-American invert
