= Z Grill =

Rare American postage stamp from 1868

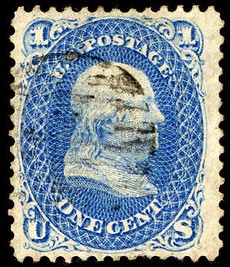
- New York Public Library; Benjamin Miller Collection
- Country of production: United States
- Date of production: 1868
- Nature of rarity: Limited number
- No. in existence: 2
- Face value: 1-cent US
- Estimated value: US $4,400,000 (2024)

The Benjamin Franklin Z Grill, or simply "Z-Grill", is a 1-cent postage stamp issued by the United States Postal Service in February 1868 depicting Benjamin Franklin. While stamps of this design were the common 1-cent stamps of the 1860s, the Z-Grill is distinguished by having the so-called "Z" variety of a grill pressed into the stamp, creating tiny indentations in the paper. Although the 1-cent Franklin Z-Grill is generally cited as the rarest and most valuable of all US postage stamps, the 15-cent Lincoln Z-Grill is just as rare, also with only 2 known to exist. The 10-cent Washington Z-Grill is scarcely less rare with only 6 known to exist. First production runs of Z-Grill process were made of the common Z-grill denominations - the 2-cent Jackson, 3-cent Washington, and 12-cent Washington stamps. The earliest known postmarks of these Z-grill stamps date from January 1868. Then in February 1868 three other denominations were printed with the Z. Grill, the above mentioned 1-cent Franklin, 10-cent Washington and 15-cent Lincoln stamps. These three denominations were only in production for a short period of time with only about 1000 of each being printed before production shifted to the F-grill – resulting in the rarity of these 3 stamps.

The "Z" pattern, unique among grill templates used by the Post Office because it incises horizontal ridges into the stamp rather than vertical ridges, was replaced within a very short time, for stamps with the D- and E-Grills were already being postmarked in mid-February.

The purpose of grilling was to permit the canceling ink to be better absorbed into the stamp paper, thus preventing reuse of stamps by washing out the cancellation marks. The use of grills was found to be impractical and they were gradually discontinued after 1870.

== Known stamps ==
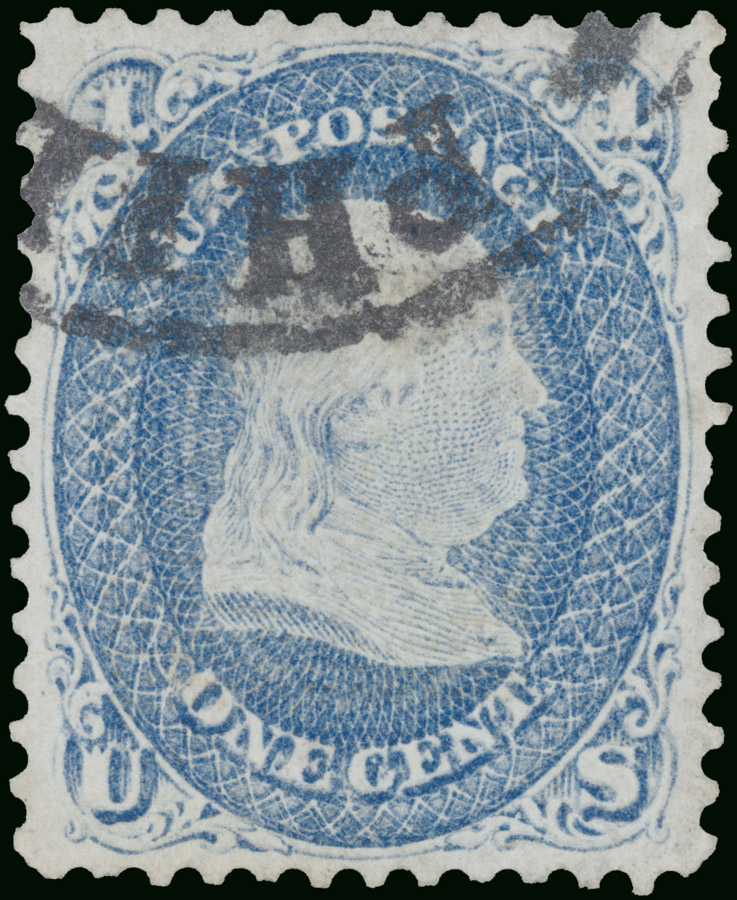
The 1-cent Z Grill: private collection

There are currently only two known 1-cent 1868 Z-Grills, both with cancellation marks. One is owned by the New York Public Library as part of the Benjamin Miller Collection. This leaves only a single 1-cent 1868 Z-Grill in private hands.

This 1868 1 cent Z-Grill stamp sold for $935,000 in 1998 to Mystic Stamp Company, a stamp dealer. Siegel Auctions auctioned the stamp as part of the Robert Zoellner collection. Zachary Sundman, the eleven-year-old son of Mystic Stamp Company President Donald Sundman, was the individual responsible for wielding the paddle and doing the actual bidding.

In late October 2005, Sundman traded this Z-Grill to financier Bill Gross for a block of four Inverted Jenny stamps worth nearly $3 million. Both Z-Grills were on display at the National Postal Museum along with the first part of the Benjamin Miller Collection from 27 May 2006 until 1 October 2007. In June 2024, the Z-Grill owned by Bill Gross was sold at auction for $4.4 million. The winning bidder remained anonymous.

== Provenance of the Privately Held 1¢ Z-Grill ==
- Unknown Collector: Discovered in 1915 but largely vanished from public view for decades.
- Lester G. Brookman: The prominent stamp dealer acquired it in 1957 and sold it to Wilbur H. Schilling, Jr.
- Andrew Levitt: Purchased in 1975 for $42,500.
- Jerry Buss: Purchased in 1977 for $90,000 by agents for the legendary, charismatic owner of the Los Angeles Lakers NBA team and an avid philatelist.
- Robert Zoellner: Purchased in 1986, where the stamp sold for $418,000.
- Mystic Stamp Company: Acquired it at a 1998 Siegel auction for $935,000.
- William H. "Bill" Gross: In November 2005, Gross acquired the stamp in a legendary, unprecedented trade. He swapped a unique $2.97 million Inverted Jenny Plate Number Block with Mystic Stamp Company just to get this 1-cent Z Grill—the final piece he needed to complete his 19th-century U.S. collection.
- Anonymous Buyer: Purchased on June 14, 2024, for $4.4 million at the landmark Gross Collection auction.

== Stamp numbering ==
In the Scott catalogue of U. S. Stamps, the 1¢ Z Grill is listed as #85A: it is one of the very few issues that does not bear a unique number but must share its numeral (85) with other stamps of different denominations. This anomaly arose because Scott created its system long before the Z pattern gained general recognition as a separate variety of grill (which did not occur until the 1910s). Accordingly, Scott assigned capital letters to the Z Grill denominations and inserted them into the catalogue after #85 (the 3¢ D Grill). The 1¢ Z Grill appeared as #85A and the 2¢ through 15¢ Z Grills were designated 85B through 85F. This expedient enabled Scott to retain the existing numbers for all subsequent stamps, beginning with the E Grill issues (#86-91).

== Provenance of the Privately Held 15¢ Z-Grill ==
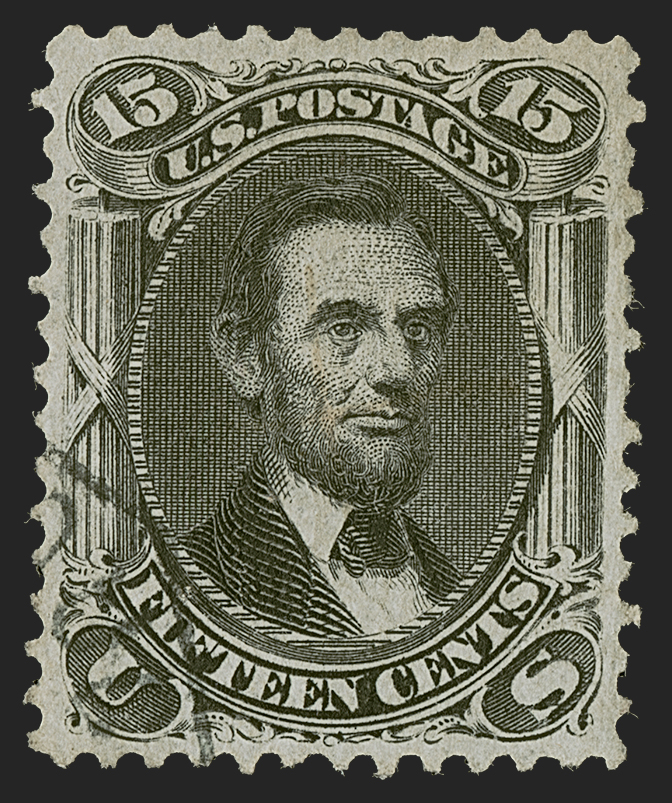
The 15-cent Z Grill: private collection

Scott Catalog identifies two documented examples of the 15¢ Z-Grill, one in the grade of Very Good, the other Extremely Fine. This provenance is for the superior Extremely Fine example.

- Saul Newbury: Discovered in his collection in 1961.
- Eugene N. Costales: Purchased in 1963 for $11,500, as an agent for an anonymous buyer.
- Bernard Peyton: A reclusive du Pont family descendant; the collection was sold in May 1986 for $100,000.
- Robert Zoellner: The only person in modern history to complete a U.S. collection.
- William H. "Bill" Gross: Acquired the stamp at the 1998 Zoellner sale for $209,000. Gross held the stamp for 26 years.
- Trevor Fried: Current owner; acquired 2024 for $2,773,000 from the William H. Gross Collection sale.

== Characteristics ==
As previously stated, the Z grill is distinguished by horizontal ridges rather than the vertical ones of other, more common, grills. Additionally, the number of points vertically and horizontally matter, but existing reference material can be confusing. The 2019 Scott catalogue and prior issues list the Z Grill as 11x14mm (13 to 14 by 17 to 18 points). The Philatelic Foundation published a dissenting paper in Opinions IV. In this article, Jerome Wagshal argues that Z grills are always clearly struck and 18 points in height is the norm, as well as pointing out that the two subtypes he has identified can be perceived as 13 points or 14 points depending on certain details of how they were struck. Beginning with the 2020 Scott Catalogue the listing for the number of horizontal points has been changed.

== See also ==
- Inverted Jenny
- List of most expensive philatelic items
- List of notable postage stamps
