= Pan-American invert =

American postage stamp with design error

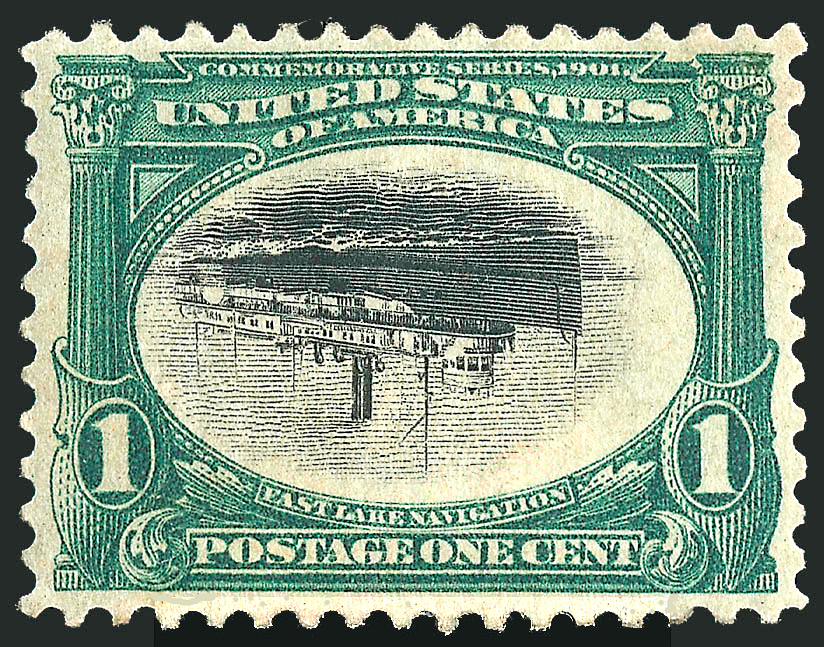
- Inverted one cent denomination
- Country of production: United States
- Date of production: May 1, 1901
- Nature of rarity: Invert error
- Face value: 1¢, 2¢ and 4¢
- Estimated value: US $$100,000

As part of the Pan-American Exposition held in Buffalo in 1901 the United States Post Office Department issued a series of six commemorative stamps. Each stamp featured an ornate colored frame enclosing a black-and-white image of some means of (or adjunct to) modern rapid transportation. In the standard American Scott catalog, these six stamps carry the numbers 294–299. The first day of issue for the stamps was May 1, 1901.

The two color printing left the possibility of errors. Three of the denominations, 1 cent, 2 cents and 4 cents, were printed in sheets on which the center vignette was inverted relative to the frame. The inverts carry the Scott catalog numbers 294a, 295a, and 296a respectively.

While the 1 cent and 2 cent inverts reached post offices by accident, the 4 cent invert was printed deliberately as the result of a misunderstanding—and, in fact, never went on sale. After the discovery of the 1¢ and 2¢ inverts in mid-1901, the Third Assistant Postmaster, Edwin C. Madden, decided to track down any additional errors, and in late summer had his assistant instruct the Bureau of Engraving and Printing to send any inverted Pan-American stamps in their inventory to Madden's office. No inverted stamps in fact remained on hand, and proper procedure would have been for the Bureau to inform Madden that none were still in stock. However, interpreting Madden's communique as an unconditional demand for inverts, the Bureau produced four sheets of them from the 4 cent plates and sent 400 copies on to Madden. The word "specimen" was then handstamped in purple ink on about half of the stamps. Between 1901 and 1904 Madden distributed 172 four cent inverts as gifts to friends, associates and his sons (also keeping one for himself), both with and without the overstamp. News of this prompted charges of impropriety and an official investigation by the Postmaster General, but Madden was cleared of any wrongdoing, given that no money had changed hands. Of the copies that remained, a pane of 100 went into the Government Collection of American Stamps in the Washington National Museum. The curator there later traded 97 inverts from that pane to stamp dealers in exchange for examples of rare U. S. issues missing from the museum's collection.(No record exists of what happened to the rest of the 400 original copies.)

The one cent invert is considerably more common than the others—still, the catalogue value of a set of all three inverts is estimated at $100,000 though one single stamp of each value was sold at auction in April 2009 for a total cost of $199,000 (respectively, $19,000; $90,000; $90,000). and a block of four of each invert value realised $1,146,000 in the same auction ($21,000; $800,000; $325,000).("Specimen" copies of the 4 cent invert command a considerably lower price than unmarked examples.)

In 2001, for the centenary of the inverts issue, the USPS produced a souvenir sheet that contained reproductions of the three original inverts, along with four 80-cent stamps based on a souvenir Cinderella stamp available at the original Pan-American Exposition. The diamond shaped cinderella stamp had 1901 in two ovals on either side of the image of the bison, while the USPS version on the souvenir changed the year to "80", making them 80 cent stamps. Fourteen million copies were printed, making this a common issue. Although the details and colors are exact copies of the originals, the date "2001" appears on the lower left corner of each of the invert stamps.

== See also ==
- Inverted Jenny
- CIA invert
- List of notable postage stamps

== References and sources ==
Notes
