= Edwards & Hanly =

Former retail brokerage and market maker

- Type: Defunct
- Industry: Financial services
- Founded: January 1, 1951
- Founder: Herbert G. Edward, Mortimer G. Hanly, Robert N. Snyder, and Lester Talbot
- Defunct: September 13, 1976
- Fate: Back offices sold to Shield Model Roland, Inc.; retail operations sold to Loeb, Rhoades, & Company; bond desk sold to Gintel & Company
- Headquarters: One Whitehall Street, New York, New York, United States
- Products: Brokerage, Bond market maker

Edwards & Hanly was an American stock brokerage firm established in Hempstead, New York, on January 1, 1951, by a partnership led by Herbert G. Edward, Mortimer G. Hanly, Robert N. Snyder, and Lester Talbot.

Throughout its existence it held a seat on the New York Stock Exchange and obtained membership in the American Stock Exchange as well. It pursued and catered to a clientele of retail stock investors, opening and maintaining up to 24 branches along the Eastern Seaboard until the business was sold in 1975.

== History ==
Notable employees include Robert Zoellner, who joined the firm in 1958, was named managing partner in 1964, and held the position until 1975, and Ivan Boesky, who was named a general partner in 1972 to run the securities arbitrage department, active until 1975.

After the collapse of the bull market in 1966, Edwards & Hanly engaged Papert Koenig Lois to craft their advertising campaign. The televised campaign, supported by newspaper ads, featured such sports stars as Joe Louis and Mickey Mantle, as well as aged burlesque dancer Sally Rand. Despite airing only in the New York market, nationally-broadcast Tonight Show host Johnny Carson would work the quotable punchlines into his routines and interviews, bringing the company to national attention.

Losses in its stock brokerage business due to the 1973-1974 stock market crash and subsequent 1973-1975 recession as well as aggressive trading in the arbitrage department, the Equity Funding insurance scandal, and losses due to the fraudulent activities of T. P. Richardson & Company caused the partnership to seek cost-cutting measures, citing the inability to negotiate more profitable commission rates after an SEC rule change in May, 1975, ended fixed commissions. In February, 1975, it outsourced its back office operations to Shields Model Roland, Inc., who took on many of the 220 Edwards & Hanly back office employees. It sold all 24 of its retail stock brokerage branches, holding some 80,000 retail accounts, to Loeb Rhoades & Company in the summer of 1975 to focus on the bond market-making business and institutional brokerage business. In 1976, the 57-person bond desk was sold to Gintel & Company. It filed for Chapter 11 bankruptcy protection on September 13, 1976.
