= Sue Gross =

American billionaire philanthropist

- Born: Sue Frank; February 1950 (age 76); Phoenix, Arizona, US
- Occupations: Philanthropist and businesswoman
- Spouse: Bill H. Gross (m. 1985; div. 2016)
- Children: Nick Gross

Sue Gross (born February 1950) is an American philanthropist and businesswoman. She was formerly the president of the William and Sue Gross Foundation, a charitable organization she co-founded with her then-husband, Bill H. Gross, an investor. In 2017, she established the Sue J. Gross Foundation to support healthcare, education, and community programs. As of July 2025, Forbes estimated her net worth at $1.6 billion.

== Early life ==
Sue Gross, born Sue Frank in February 1950, in Phoenix, Arizona. She has two sisters, Sally Warpinski and Sandra Stubban. In 1985, she moved to Laguna Beach, California.

== Career ==
Gross has served on several boards, including the Dean's Cabinet of the Sue & Bill Gross School of Nursing at the University of California, Irvine, the Orange County Teacher of the Year program, and the Irvine Cove Community Board.

== Philanthropy ==
Gross served as president of the William and Sue Gross Family Foundation and was responsible for approximately $700 million in grants to healthcare, medical research, and education.

In a 2016 Bloomberg interview, Bill Gross stated that Sue Gross managed the foundation's operations, saying, 'Sue's in charge of that. She spends all her time looking for opportunities, a lot of them local. I report to her.'

Sue is no longer connected to the foundation, a representative said, and has been running another under her name in recent years.

in January, 2005, Duke University in Durham, North Carolina announced a $23.5 million gift from Bill and Sue Gross to endow undergraduate and medical school scholarships, as well as support faculty members in the business school. Duke University president Richard H. Brodhead stated that the gift would support undergraduate and medical school scholarships and faculty positions in the business school. In 2010, they made a $10 million gift to fund a stem cell laboratory at UC Irvine. After seeing a “60 Minutes” report in 2012, the couple reportedly began writing anonymous $15,000 checks to workers laid off from the Space Shuttle program following NASA's termination of the program.

Bill and Sue Gross donated $40 million to the University of California, Irvine in 2016 to establish a nursing school and construct a building. According to the university, the gift was the largest in the institution's history.

Hospitals and research wings throughout the state bear the Gross family name. A gallery at the Smithsonian Institution housing their stamp collection was funded with a $10 million donation. In 2017, Sue Gross established her charitable foundation, the Sue J. Gross Foundation.

The first announced donation was a portion of the $36.9 million in proceeds from Gross's sale of Pablo Picasso's “Le Repos”. She donated $35,000 in October 2018 to the inaugural Chef Masters event on behalf of the Alzheimer's Family Center in Orange County. She gave $5,000 to the Los Angeles Center for Law and Justice's 46th Annual Awards Gala in May 2019.

== Personal life ==
In 1985, Sue Gross married Bill H. Gross, the billionaire co-founder of Pacific Investment Management Co. (PIMCO). The couple had one son, Nick Gross, a musician and entrepreneur. She was also stepmother to Bill Gross's two children from a previous marriage. The couple divorced in 2018.

Additionally, Gross collects fine art. In a 2015 letter to investors, Bill Gross described her as “the artist in the family”, noting that she often recreated famous artworks using an overhead projector and canvas, and quoted her saying, "Why spend $20 million? I can paint that one for $75". A painting styled after Picasso, signed by Sue, was displayed in their home. During their divorce proceedings, one point of contention was Pablo Picasso’s 1932 painting Le Repos. According to reports, Sue Gross won the painting in a coin toss.

Bill Gross later alleged the original had been replaced with a copy, though court testimony indicated he had told her to “take all the furniture and art you'd like”. A representative for Sue Gross stated the imitation was distinguishable due to a different frame.

Sue Gross filed for divorce in November, 2016. She later requested a temporary restraining order, citing alleged harassment, and both parties were granted restraining orders at different points during the proceedings. The divorce settlement awarded Sue Gross approximately $1.3 billion, including a $36 million home in Laguna Beach and half of the couple's extensive art collection.

== Real estate ==
Gross owns four of the twelve homes in Abalone Point, a gated section of Laguna Beach’s Irvine Cove community. She also holds properties in Palm Springs and Beverly Hills. In December 2024, she sold a Beverly Hills residence with four bedrooms and four and a half bathrooms for $33 million, approximately six percent below the $35 million asking price. The 6,569‑square‑foot home had been purchased in 2018 for $20 million.
