= CIA invert =

American postage stamp with printing error

- Country of production: United States
- Date of production: 2 July 1979
- Nature of rarity: Invert error
- No. in existence: 100
- Face value: US $1.00
- Estimated value: US $15,000

The CIA invert is a one-dollar value postage stamp error issued by the United States Postal Service. It is one stamp from the Americana series that were produced between 1975 and 1981. The $1 colonial rushlight holder stamp was first issued on July 2, 1979, and one pane of 100 stamps was issued with the dark brown (the last color printed, though it covers much of the stamp) inverted. The lamp candle holder, candle outline and text are inverted relative to the flame. About 95 copies have been accounted for. The stamp's Scott catalogue number is 1610c. This was the first United States stamp issued with a major design element printed upside down since the Dag Hammarskjöld invert error of 1962. As these $1 stamps were printed in sheets of 400, three additional panes of 100 stamps certainly existed at one time, but no trace of these has been discovered.

When the one known pane of this invert was discovered, in the spring of 1986, it had already been on sale at the post office in McLean, Virginia, for some time without anyone noticing the error: indeed, five of its one hundred stamps had been sold by unsuspecting clerks, and the portion of the selvage bearing the plate number was no longer attached. In this incomplete form, the pane was purchased by an employee of the CIA, who had been sent to the post office to buy stamps for the agency. The purchaser failed at first to notice that the flames were inverted relative to the candle holder and lettering. Only several days later was the error discovered, by a CIA employee who needed a $1 stamp for an agency mailing. Once this man had shared his information with eight colleagues, the nine decided to acquire the error stamps for themselves. Purchasing 95 normal $1 stamps, the group exchanged these for the CIA's inverts. They then revealed their find to an Annandale, Virginia stamp dealer, Ike Snyder, who referred them to a New Jersey stamp specialist, Jacques C. Schiff, Jr. Eventually, the group struck a deal with Schiff. Each of the nine employees kept a single inverted stamp; Schiff paid a reported $25,000 for a block of 85 inverts along with a single stamp that had been damaged.

Initially, Schiff shielded the members of the group from scrutiny, announcing that the fourteen stamps from the sheet not sold to him had all been used on CIA mailings. However, after the true story surfaced in the mass media (revealed by The New York Times and CBS news), the stamp became known as the CIA invert, and the agency was obliged to make its own investigation. Ultimately, the CIA demanded that the nine employees return their inverts to the agency, stating that anyone who failed to comply would be terminated. Four returned their stamps and kept their jobs, four refused and were fired, while the ninth claimed that he had lost his stamp and remained a CIA employee.

Stamp catalogs list its price as only $15,000, one-tenth of the Inverted Jenny that is valued at $150,000, despite the fact that about the same number of each stamp exist. A block of four stamps sold in 2004 for $60,000 and a second block was sold in 2015 for $71,875. Reproductions have been sold on eBay.

== See also ==
- Inverted Jenny
- Pan-American invert
- List of notable postage stamps
