= Grill (philately) =

Embossed pattern to discourage postage stamp reuse

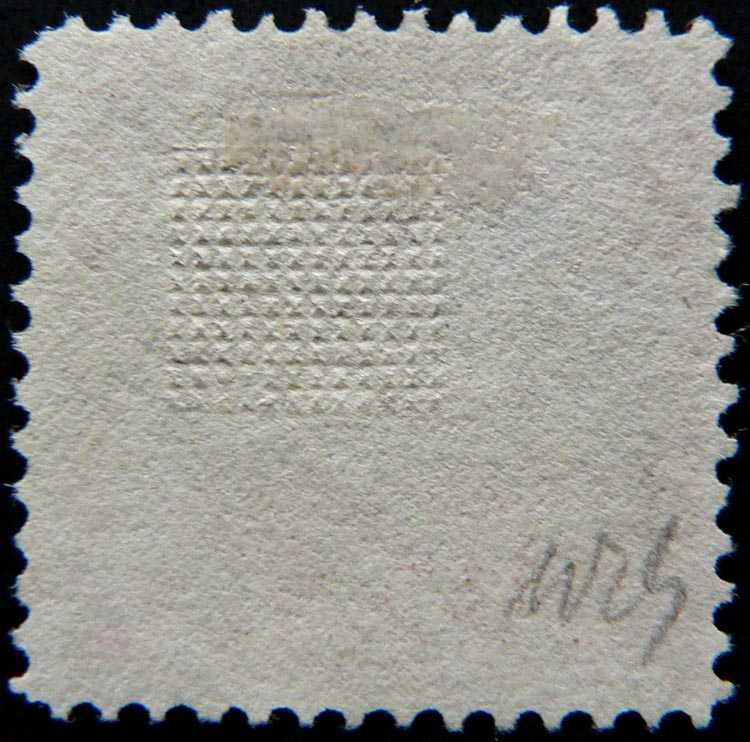
"G" grill on a stamp of the 1869 issue

A grill on a postage stamp is an embossed pattern of small indentations intended to discourage postage stamp reuse. Used in the United States in the 1860s and 1870s, they were designed to allow the ink of the cancellation to be absorbed more readily by the fibres of the stamp paper, making it harder to wash off the cancellation.

== In the United States ==
The best-known (indeed only major) examples of grilling are the United States issues of the late 1860s and early 1870s, when grilling was standard for all US stamps. "Grilling" therefore remains a specialist interest only for American philatelists. While many types of grilled stamps are common, certain of the grill patterns were little-used, and define some of the great rarities of philately. In particular, the 1-cent stamp with the "Z" grill is generally cited as the rarest of all US stamps (only two copies are known), and is commonly known simply as the Z Grill. A recently discovered grill issue, the 30-cent "I" grill stamp, may be even rarer, for only one example has thus far been identified.

The idea of grilling was first suggested by Charles F. Steel, a supervisor at the National Bank Note Company, with correspondence on the subject dating from 1865. The purpose of grilling stamps was to break the paper fiber of the stamp. This would cause the ink cancellation mark to soak into the paper fiber making them more difficult to wash and reuse as postage.

The first type of grill to be tried, termed by philatelists the "A" grill, was applied to the entire stamp. Stamps so treated were distributed to post offices for testing in August 1867, and apparently satisfactory, as National received a contract stipulating use of grilling for all stamps. However, the actual practice of grilling on a large scale had not been completely worked out, and the process significantly weakened sheets, resulting in tearing during perforation and general production handling. National soon switched to the use of a small rectangular pattern of indentations, and subsequent grills were all of this form.

National's contract did not specify the type of grill pattern, and the details changed as they experimented with equipment. Many of the details have been lost to history; in 1910s, philatelist William L. Stevenson introduced a system of distinguishing types of grills, and identifying them by letter. Later research clarified some of the details of chronology.

No G, H, I or J grills are found on the 1861–1868 issue, for this series went out of production before they were introduced. The 1869 issue used only the G grill, while the 1870 issue used H and I grills. Fears of reuse had abated by the early 1870s, and grilling seems to have been quietly dropped from the production process. Some stamps of the Continental Bank Note Company (who took over production from National) are known to have been impressed with the "J" grill as late as 1875.

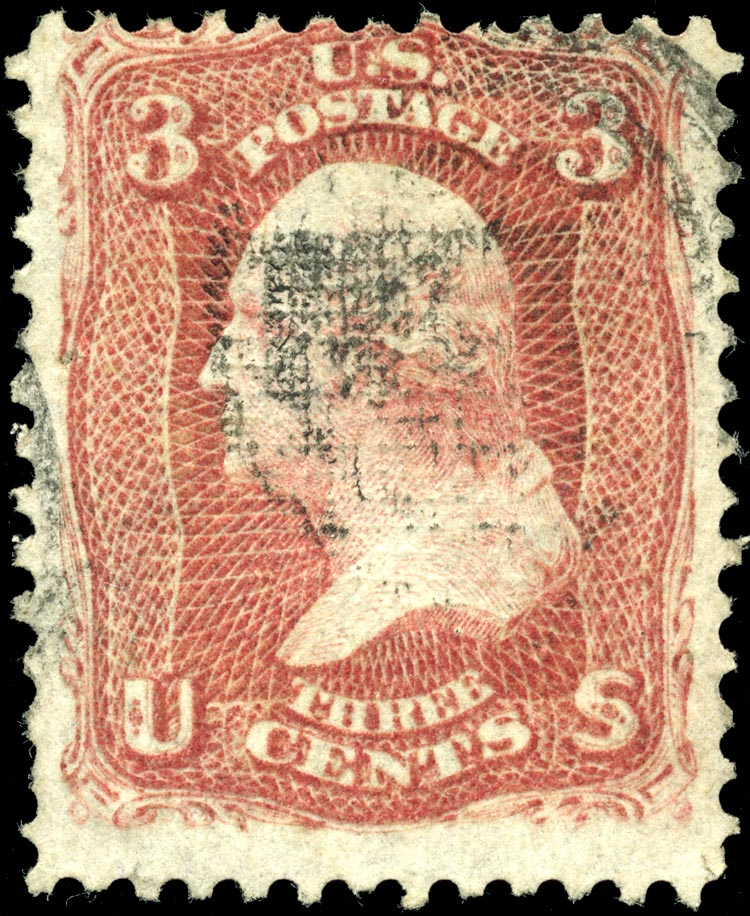
The F grill on this 1867 stamp is visible as a grid pattern in the ink of the cancellation.

Grills:

- A Grill – overall (first experimental grill)
- C Grill – points up, 16–17 x 18–21 points (second experimental)
- Z Grill – points down, points with horizontal ridges, 13–14 x 17–18 points
- D Grill – points down, vertical ridges, 15 x 17–18 points
- E Grill – points down, vertical or "X" ridges, 14 x 15–17 points
- F Grill – points down, vertical or "X" ridges, 11–12 x 15–17 points
- B Grill – points up, "X" ridges, 22 x 18 points
- G Grill – points down, vertical ridges, 12 x 11–11.5 points
- H Grill – points down, vertical ridges, 11–13 x 14–16 points
- I Grill – points down, vertical ridges, 10–11 x 10–13 points
- J Grill – points down, vertical ridges, 9–10 x 12 points

The least-widely used of these patterns (all associated with the 1861-68 issue) were the "B" and "C" Grills (both found on only the three-cent denomination), the "D" Grill (found only on the two-cent and three-cent denomination) and the "A" Grill (found only on the three-cent, five-cent and thirty-cent denominations). The rarest grilled U. S. stamps are:

- thirty-cent I Grill (1 surviving copy—see note below)
- one-cent Z Grill (2 surviving copies)
- fifteen-cent Z Grill (2 surviving copies)
- twelve-cent I Grill (2 surviving copies—see note below)
- ninety-cent I Grill (3 surviving copies—see note below)
- three-cent B Grill (4 surviving copies)
- five-cent A Grill (4 surviving copies)
- ten-cent Z Grill (6 surviving copies)
- thirty-cent A Grill (8 surviving copies)

Note: Given that intensive studies of the I Grill began only recently, additional copies of the I Grill issues listed here may well be discovered in the future.

Because certain grill patterns were only belatedly recognized as features of separate collectible stamp issues, not every U. S. grilled stamp was assigned its own individual numeral in the standard Scott catalogue. Issues that share numerals are as follows:
3-cent D grill, 85; the six Z grill issues, 85A-85F.
H grill issues, 134-144; I grill issues, 134A-141A; 143A-144A.
Scott moreover lists stamps bearing the experimental J grill as minor variants (denoted by small letters) of non-grilled issues: 156e, 157c, 158e, 159b, 160a, 161c, 162a, 163a, 165c, 179c.

== The B grill ==
Four stamps featuring the "B grill" pattern are known to exist, all used. All of them are of the three-cent denomination, and are numbered as Scott #82. All four stamps came from a letter sent to Prussia. The stamps were originally given a Mason, Texas cancel. Once they went to Germany (on or about March 3, 1869), they were given a German transit-date stamp. The cover was discovered in 1969 and raised controversy in the philatelic market because certain issues of the much more common "C grill" had been partially erased. This occurred during the grill roller's changing to use C grills instead of the all-over A grill. No additional "B grill" stamps have been discovered since, and one of the stamps from the cover was sold in 1993 for $85,000. Another B grill was sold again as part of the 1998 Zoellner sale (which featured the 1c Z grill) but sold for about $155,000. In 2008, the stamp was sold again, this time for over one million dollars.

== In Peru ==
Although the National Banknote Company ceased issuing U.S. stamps after being supplanted by Continental in 1873, it soon began to produce stamps for Peru, on a contract that stipulated the use of the grilling process. Grills of three different types appear on regular issue stamps of Peru produced between 1874 and 1884. One of these Peru grills displays the horizontal ridges that characterize the American Z grill, but the Peruvian version is smaller in size, measuring 9 x 14 mm. The other two grills measure, respectively, 11 x 15½ mm. and 10 x 12 mm.

== See also ==
- Z Grill The Benjamin Franklin Z-Grill 1c stamp 1868.
