= Benjamin Miller Collection =

Philatelic collection

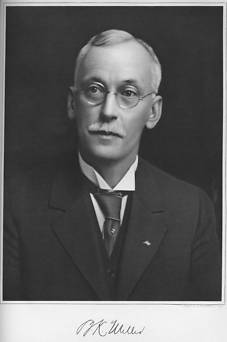
Benjamin K. Miller

The Benjamin K. Miller Collection is a unique collection of stamps and other philatelic materials donated to the New York Public Library in 1925 by Milwaukee attorney Benjamin Kurtz Miller (1857–1928). This collection has been considered the first complete collection of U.S. stamps ever assembled. His collection is known as the "crown jewels" of U.S. stamp collecting for its rare holdings, depth, and variety. Miller's collection was not complete, missing some stamps then listed by Scott.

== One cent Z Grill ==
Of the great rarities and philatelic items in the collection is the One-Cent Z Grill, one of the rarest of all U.S. stamps. Only two copies of this stamp are known to exist; the other copy is in the collection of Bill Gross.

== Background ==
Benjamin Kurtz Miller was born in 1857, the son of a Milwaukee lawyer and grandson of one of the first federal judges in Wisconsin. He joined his father’s firm in 1877 and later became a partner, retiring in 1906 to pursue personal interests. The firm continues today through its successor, the major U.S. law firm Foley & Lardner.

== The collection ==
Miller built his collection a little late in life at the age of 61. He started stamp collecting seriously on a large scale only after 1918, when he bought one of the famous Inverted Jenny stamps at the age of 61. Later he intensified his collecting, by writing articles in stamp journals and purchasing from up to 30 dealers.

By the early 1920s, Miller was on the way to his ultimate achievement: collecting one example of every U.S. postage stamp in the Scott catalogue of his day. He also collected varieties like color shades, frauds and forgeries, fresh unused stamps, and varied cancellations. Miller also enjoyed plating stamps, seeking one copy for each position on a printing plate.

== The display ==
The collection was displayed at the library for more than 50 years. However it was locked away after a theft of 153 of its rarest stamps in 1977. Even though 81 of the stamps were later recovered (some of them mutilated to disguise their provenance) the library did not put the collection back on display.

It returned to public view when the National Postal Museum put it on display in two parts in from 27 May 2006 to 1 October 2007, and in 2007 from 5 November to 12 January 2009.

== Recognition ==
In recognition of Miller's philatelic accomplishments and scholarship, the Royal Philatelic Society upgraded his status from "member" to "fellow".
