= Henry Ellis Harris =

American philatelist and stamp dealer

- Born: January 21, 1902; Atlanta, Georgia
- Died: December 29, 1977 (aged 75); Newton, Massachusetts
- Known for: Developed a postage stamp catalog that sold millions of stamps worldwide
- Spouse: Gertrude Elizabeth Mulvey
- Awards: Luff Award (1966); APS Hall of Fame (1979)

Henry Ellis Harris (January 21, 1902 – December 29, 1977), commonly known as H. E. Harris, was an American philatelist and stamp dealer who through his company, H. E. Harris & Co., popularized stamp collecting for many Americans, especially children.

== Biography ==
Harris was born in Atlanta in 1902. At age 14, while living in Washington, D. C., he began his stamp career. He seized the opportunity to begin a mail-order stamp business when The Washington Post offered free classified ads to teenagers. Harris later opened his first retail store in 1921 at Kenmore Square in Boston.

Over the years, advertisements by H. E. Harris, which offered a quantity of stamps for a small amount of money (usually less than $1) on the condition that additional stamps were sent on approval, became ubiquitous in many magazines and comic books. While the company was noted for selling low-cost packets of stamps, it sold rarities as well.

The company developed a fully illustrated postage stamp catalog that sold for a fraction of the cost of the more detailed Scott Stamp Catalogue.

=== Stamp club ===
Procter & Gamble (P&G) sponsored the radio show Ivory Stamp Club of the Air during the Great Depression. The show was hosted by "Captain Tim" Healy, a former officer in the Australian Army, world traveler, and raconteur. H. E. Harris was contracted by P&G to send each new club member a stamp album, badge and packet of stamps in exchange for an Ivory soap wrapper. To receive more stamp packets, members could send two soap wrappers and 10¢. When the last show was broadcast in 1936, the club had 2.5 million members. Many of them became Harris customers and helped build the company into one of the largest stamp businesses in the world.

=== Kenmore Stamp Company ===
Harris purchased the Kenmore Stamp Company of Kenmore, New York, in 1943. His son, H. E. Harris Jr. (born 1925), had started selling stamps to various local drug, novelty, and variety stores while still in elementary school. After serving in the Eighth Air Force in England during World War II, the younger Harris purchased the Kenmore name from his father and re-established the company in Arlington, Massachusetts. In 1951, the company was again relocated, to Milford, New Hampshire.

=== Litigation ===
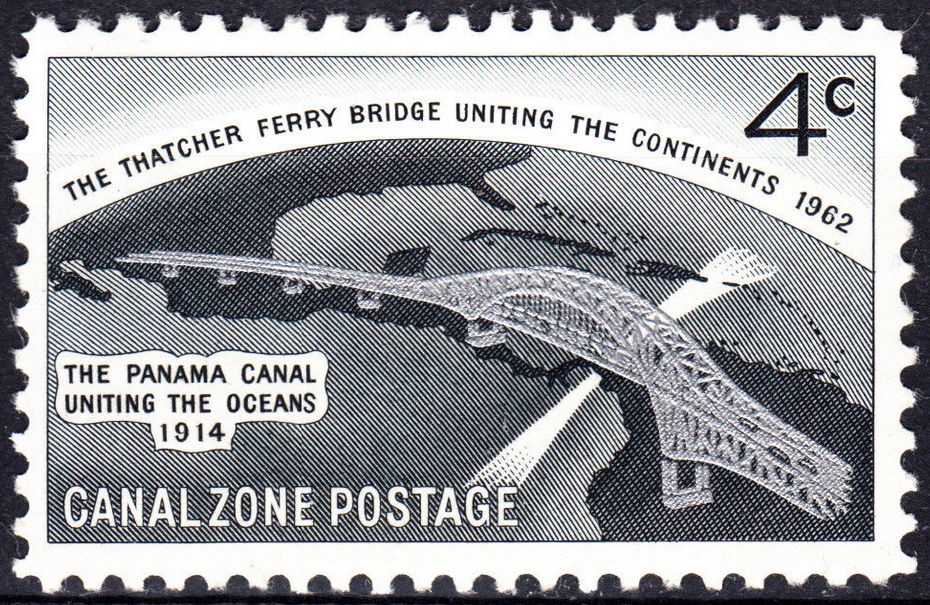
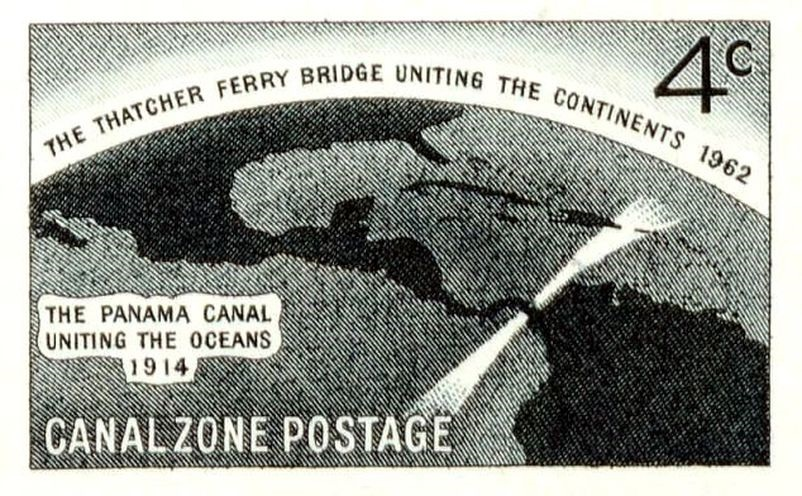
Canal Zone stamps: correct (left) and error

Harris gained media attention in 1962 when he went to court to prevent the Canal Zone and the United States Post Office Department from issuing large quantities of intentional error stamps to destroy the value of a few stamps that had reached circulation honoring the opening of the Thatcher Ferry Bridge (now the Bridge of the Americas) but lacking the silver ink used to depict the bridge. Harris had acquired some of the error stamps, and claimed that the issuance, which would reduce the value of the error stamps to a few cents each, violated his rights. He was successful in his lawsuit, for which he received the Luff Award from the American Philatelic Society in 1966 for exceptional contributions to philately.

=== Later years ===
In 1975, Harris sold his business to the venture capital arm of General Mills, which discontinued the stamps-on-approval mail-order service. Harris died in 1977 at Newton-Wellesley Hospital in Newton, Massachusetts. In 1979, Harris was posthumously elected to the American Philatelic Society Hall of Fame. In 2003, H. E. Harris & Co. consolidated with Whitman Coin Products, becoming Whitman Publishing. In November 2023, Whitman Publishing/H.E. Harris & Co. and its product brands were acquired by CDN Publishing, LLC, consolidating two longtime leaders in numismatic and philatelic publications. Now known as Whitman Brands, the company unites the distinct brands CDN, Whitman, H.E. Harris, Cowens, and Whitman Expos under one umbrella, aiming to serve the entire collecting community.
