= US Army and US Navy stamp issues of 1936–1937 =

During the years 1936 to 1937 the United States Post Office issued a series of commemorative stamps honoring prominent figures of the U.S. Army and U.S. Navy who served during the earlier chapters of American history. President Theodore Roosevelt had campaigned for these issues while he was president. The issues, however, did not materialize until President Franklin D. Roosevelt, an avid stamp collector himself, and a frequent motivator of stamp issues and designs, had campaigned for their release. Ten stamps in all were issued on different dates during the course of six months, with the denominations of 1, 2, 3, 4 and 5 cents for both the army and navy issues.

Army issues

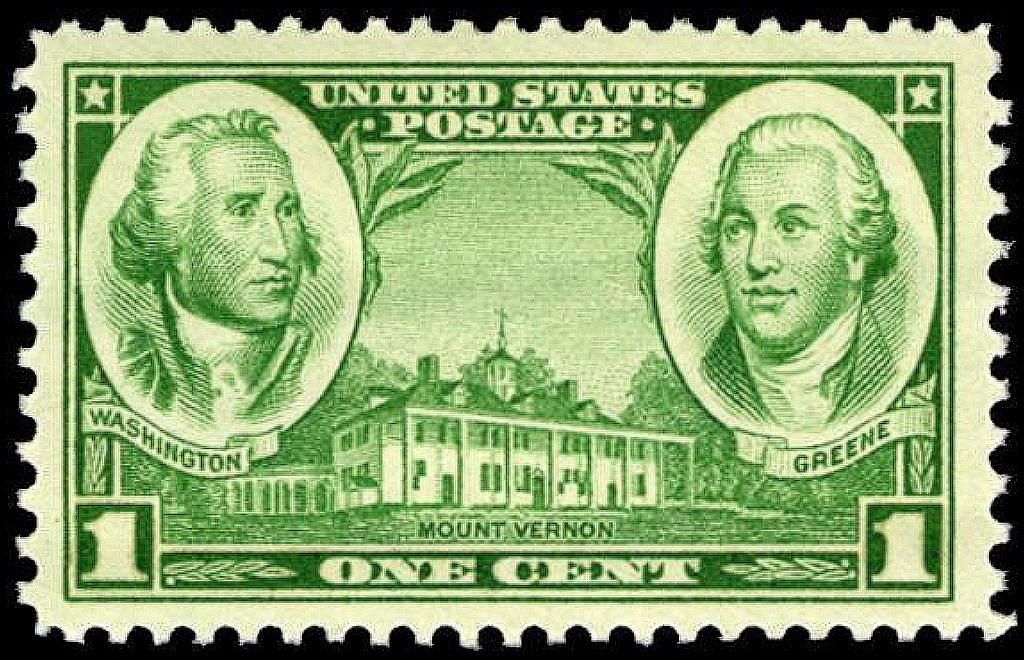
Washington — Greene issued December 15, 1936

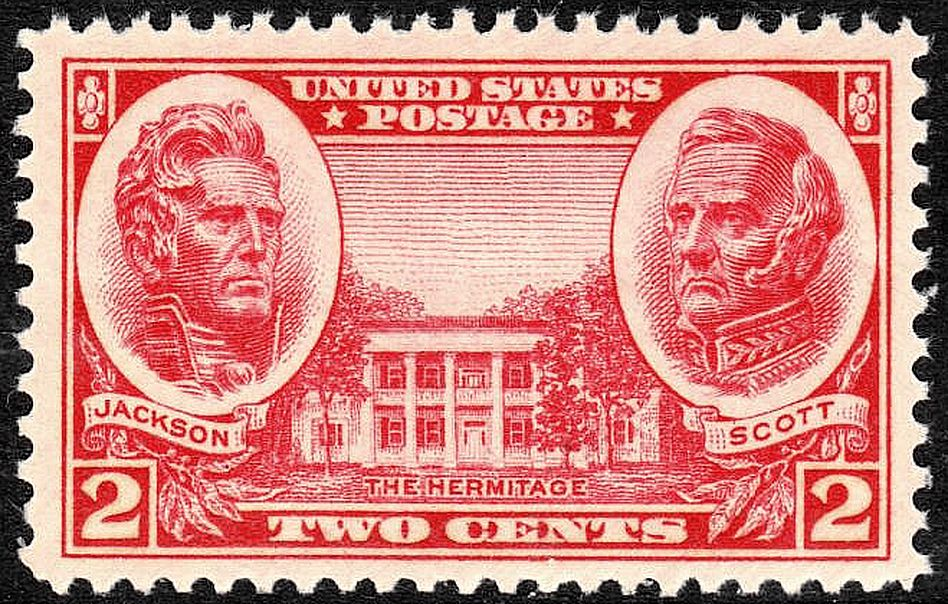
Jackson — Scott issued January 15, 1937

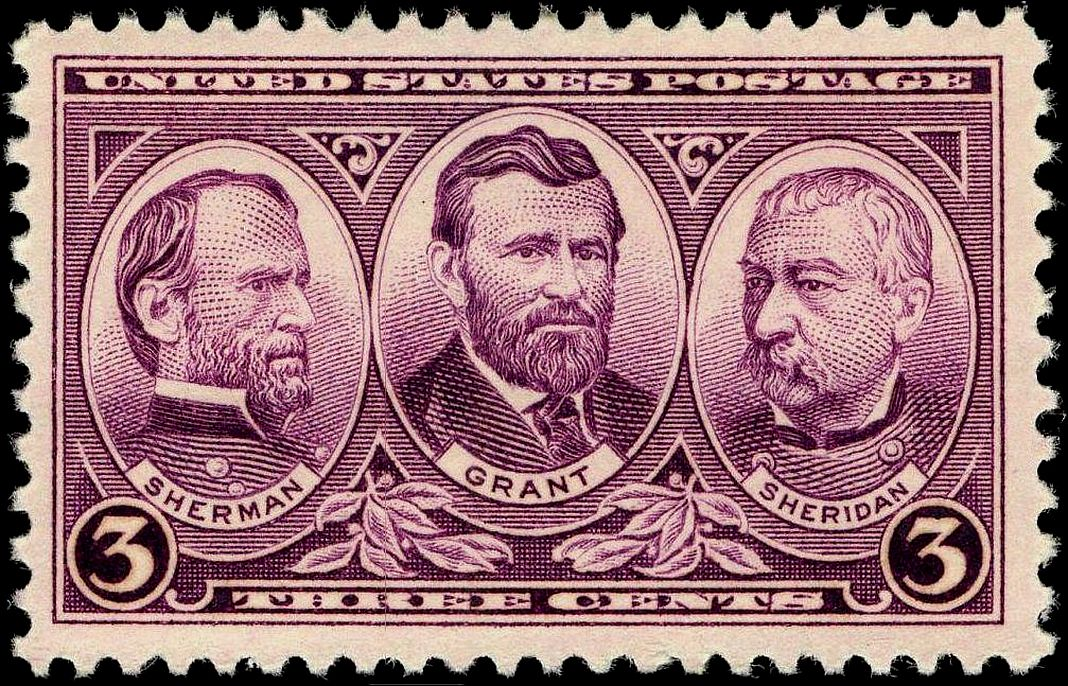
Sherman — Grant — Sheridan issued February 18, 1937

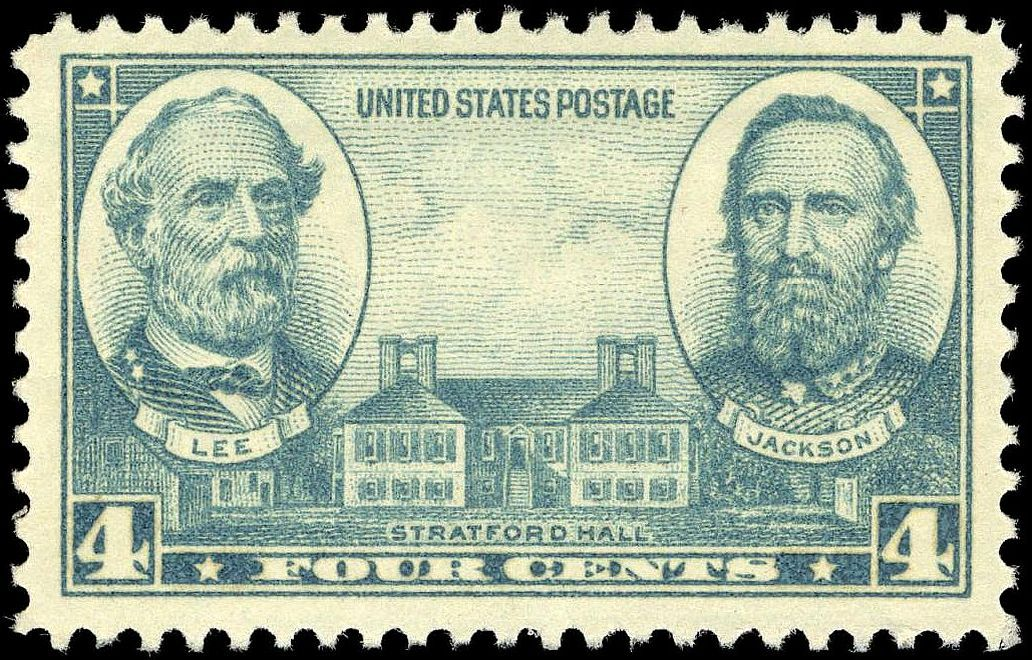
Lee — Jackson issued March 23, 1937

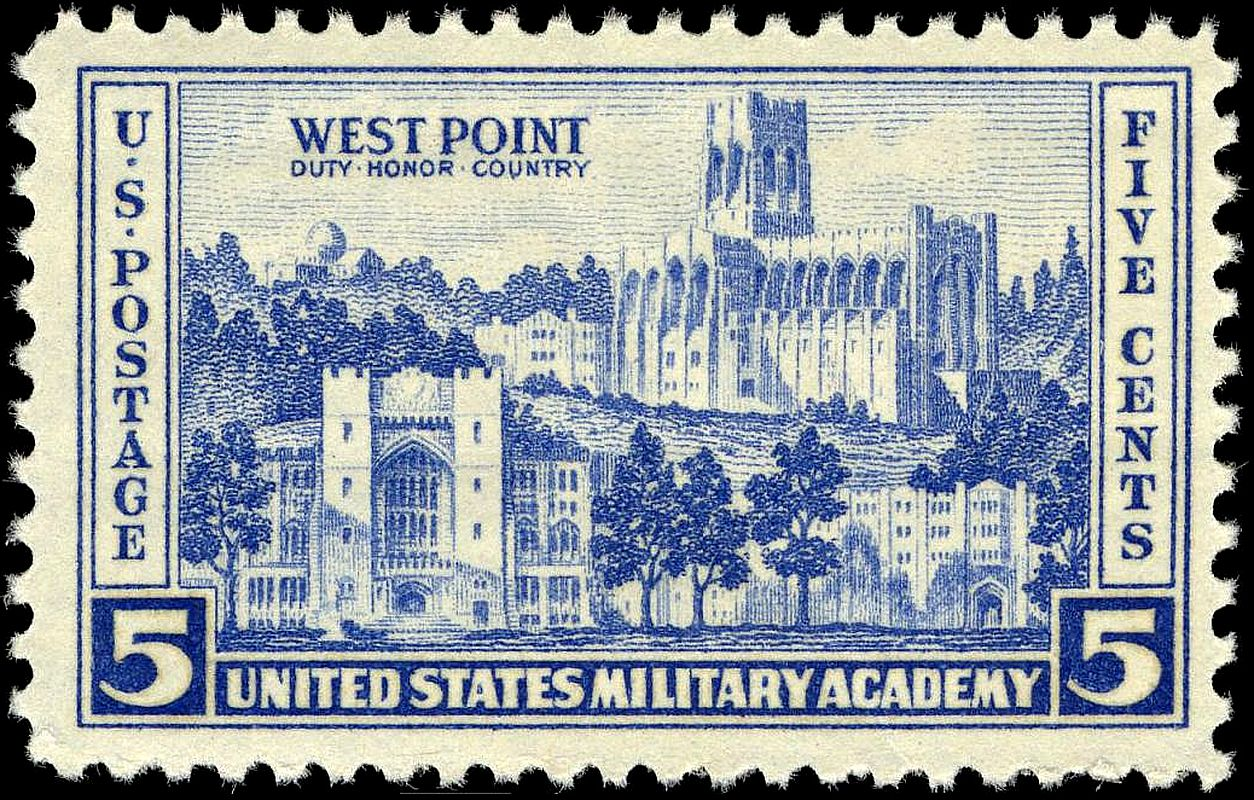
West Point issued May 26, 1937

Navy issues

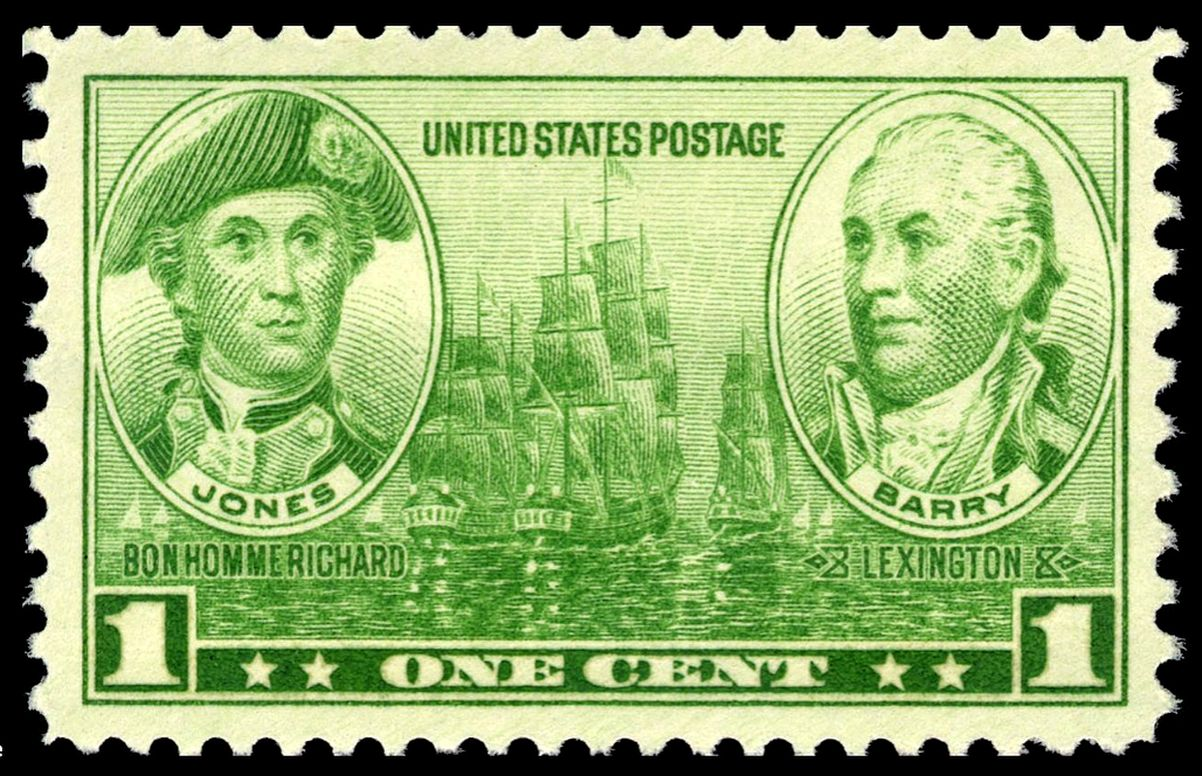
Jones -- Barry issued December 15, 1936

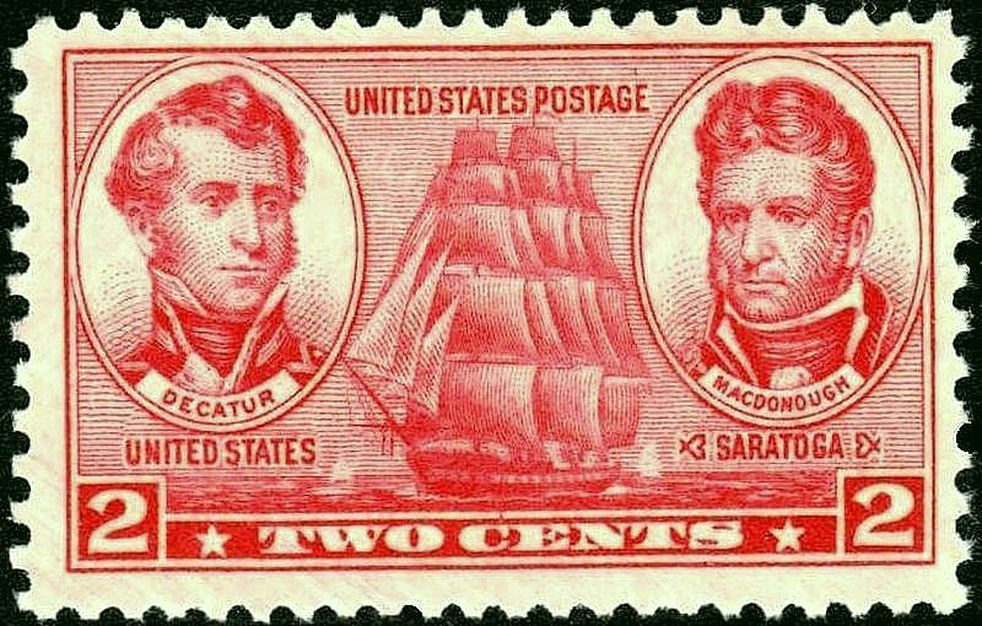
Decatur -- MacDonough issued January 15, 1937

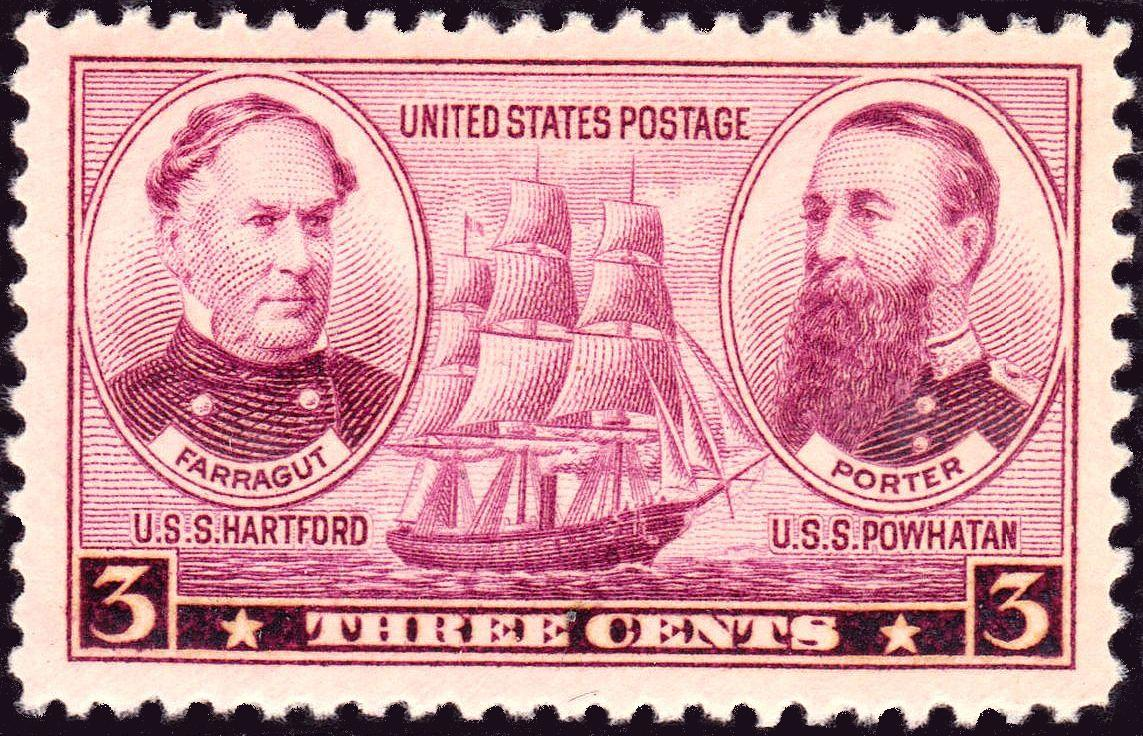
Farragut -- Porter issued February 18, 1937

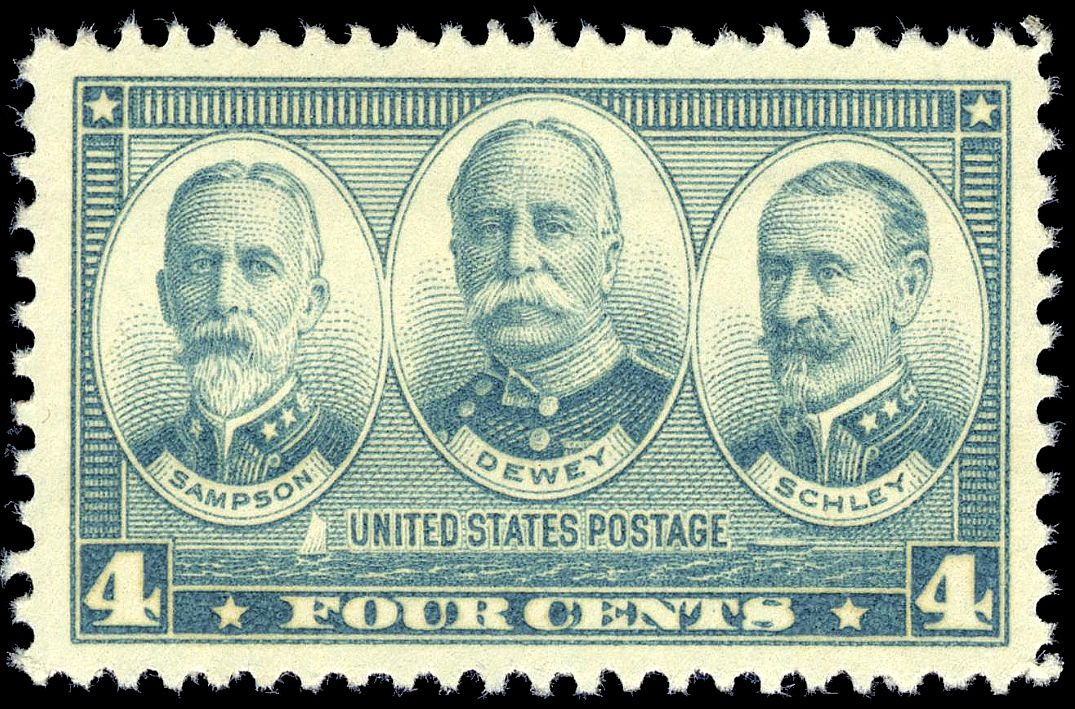
Sampson — Dewey — Schley issued March 23, 1937

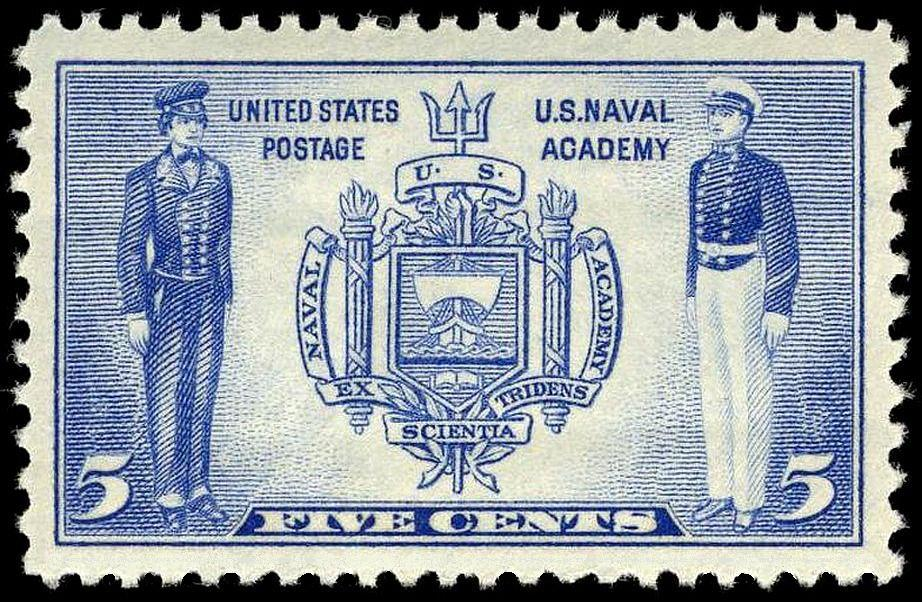
Seal of U.S. Naval Academy issued May 26, 1937

The Army and Navy issues were released consecutively in numerical order, beginning with the 1 cent issues. The first day of issue for the army issues took place at West Point and Washington DC, while the navy issues were first released at Annapolis, Maryland and Washington DC. The 1 cent stamps for the army and navy issues were issued on the same date, and respectively for the other denominations.

There was controversy over the Lee-Jackson stamp. The Pittsburgh Courier, an African American weekly newspaper published an editorial denouncing it because of Lee's defense of slavery.. It was also noted at the time that the portrait of Lee is missing the third star on his uniform. And placing William T. Sherman on a stamp led to objections by the legislatures of Georgia and South Carolina, although he had been on earlier issues, apparently without comment.

== See also ==
- Postage stamps and postal history of the United States
- Presidents of the United States on U.S. postage stamps
- Commemoration of the American Civil War on postage stamps
- Champion of Liberty commemorative stamps
- Postage stamps and postal history of the Confederate States
- American Credo postal Issues

== Sources ==
- Scott United States stamp catalogue specialized. New York, NY: Scott Publications, Inc. 1958.
- Houseman, Donna, ed. (2015). 2016 Scott Specialized Catalogue of United States Stamps and Covers. Ohio: Amos Media. ISBN 978-0-89487-5045.
- "Army & Navy Issue". Smithsonian National Postal museum.
