= Champion of Liberty commemorative stamps =

1957–1961 US postage stamp series

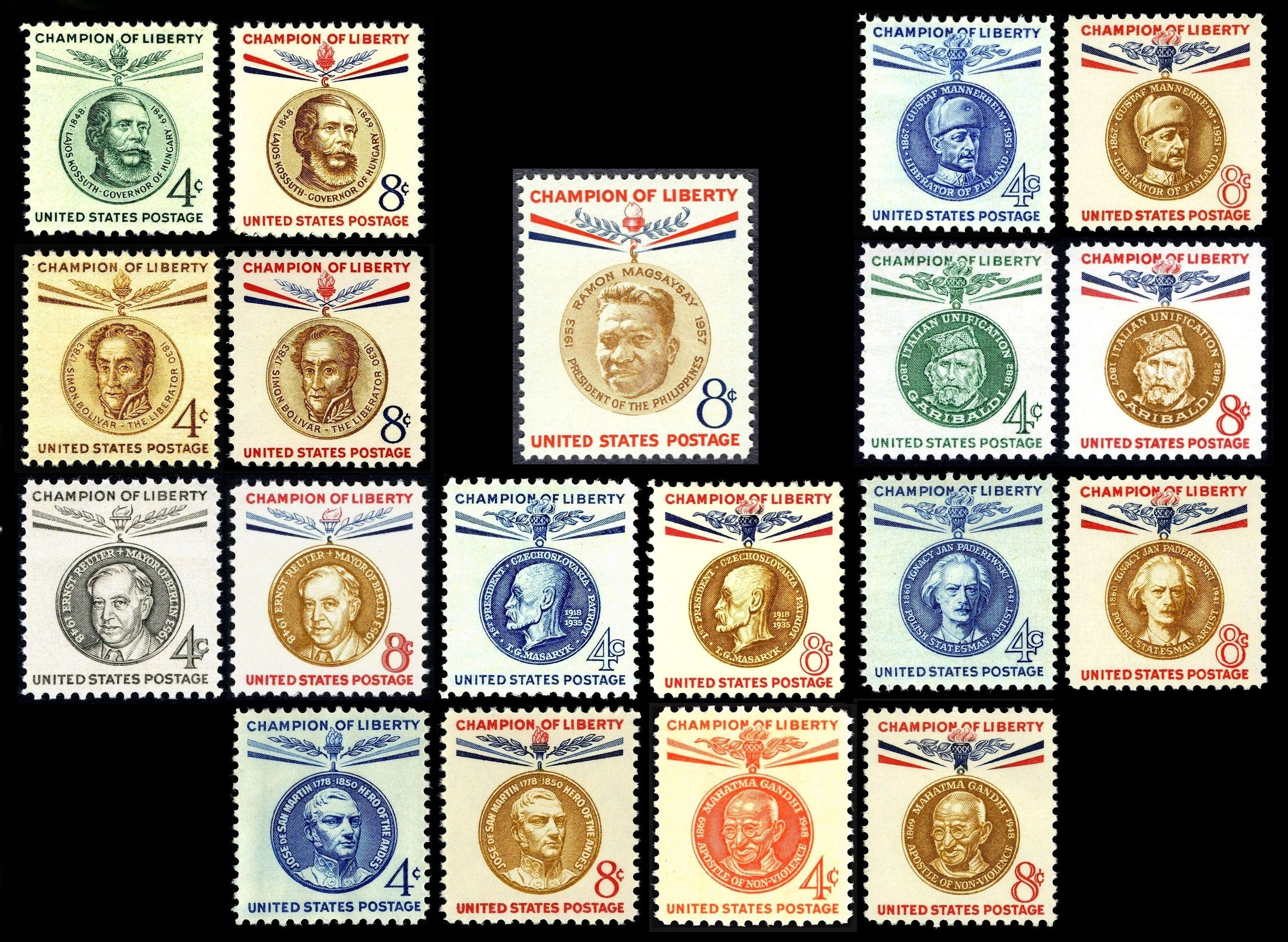
Champion of Liberty series Printed by the U.S. Bureau of Engraving and Printing Issued between 1957 and 1961

Champion of Liberty commemorative stamps, also known as the Champion of Liberty series, were a series of nineteen commemorative stamps issued periodically by the United States Post Office between 1957 and 1961 in honor of ten men who fought for the cause of freedom and independence in their home countries. The stamp issues also served as a political and social statement against the perceived totalitarianism of the Soviet Union during the Cold War. The first day covers were postmarked in Washington D.C. with specially made "First Day of Issue" cancellations that often included a symbol related to the man commemorated on the given issues. There is evidence that during this period of the Cold War the CIA was particularly interested in promoting this series.

== Champion of Liberty series ==
With one exception, each subject depicted on the Champion of Liberty stamps were printed in 4-cent and 8-cent denominations, and were first issued on the same date in the same city. The Magsaysay 8-cent issue of 1957 was only issued in an 8-cent denomination and perforated 11 gauge, while all the other issues were issued in 4-cent and 8-cent denominations and were perforated 10½ by 11 gauge. The 4-cent stamps were printed in one color, while the 8-cent stamps were printed with three colors. All issues were printed by the Bureau of Engraving and Printing on the Giori Press. The Champion of Liberty series of stamps were all first issued in Washington DC, on their respective dates of issue.

=== Ramon Magsaysay issue ===
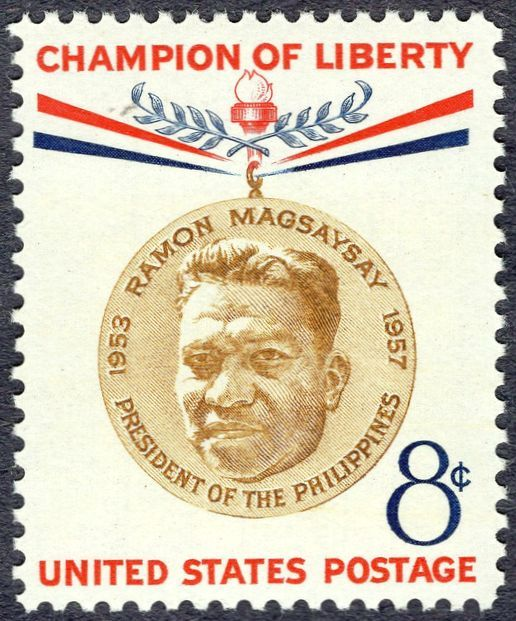
Magsaysay, 8c, 1958 issue

Ramon Magsaysay was a Filipino statesman who served as the seventh president of the Philippines, from December 30, 1953, until his death in an aircraft disaster on March 17, 1957. (Note: General Cabal said metal fatigue had broken a drive shaft that caused power failure aboard the twin-engine C-47 after takeoff from Cebu City on the Island of Cebu on a flight to Manila.", resulting in the crash.) An oversized stamp issue compared to the others in the series, is the only Champion of Liberty stamp that was first issued in the year 1957, in Washington DC on August 31 of that year.

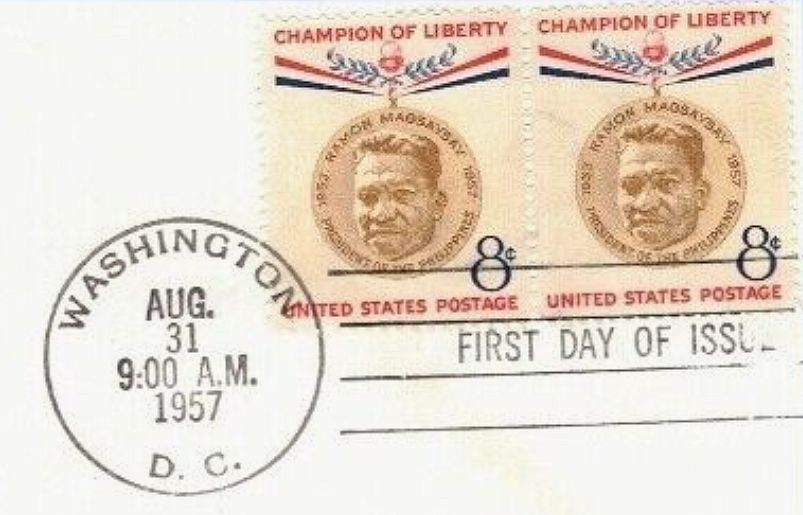
Magsaysay, FDC cancellation, August 31, 1957

=== Lajos Kossuth issue ===
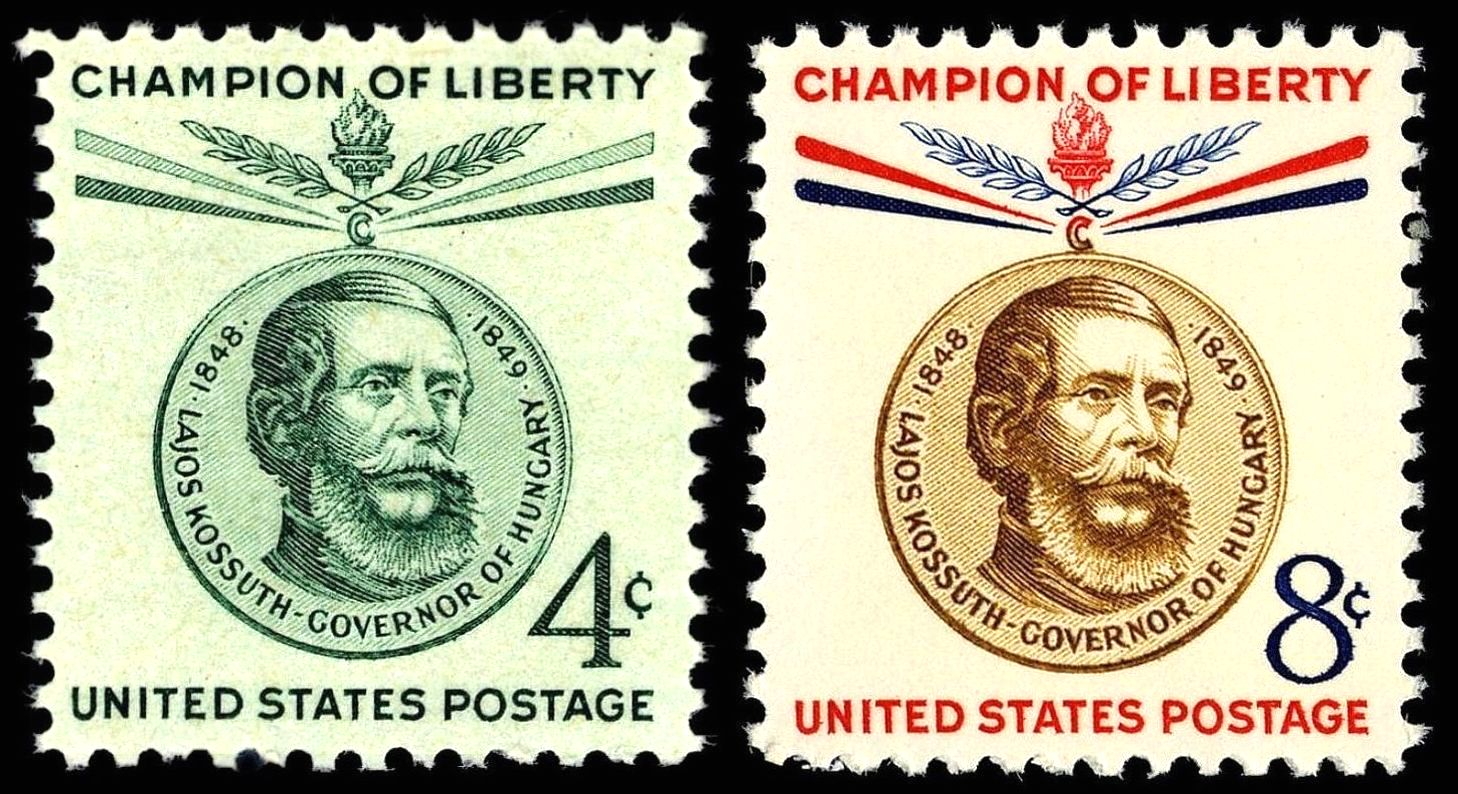
Lajos Kossuth,1958 issues

Lajos Kossuth, or Louis Kossuth, (1802 – 1894) was a leader of the Hungarian Revolution, and supported a war for independence from the Austrian Empire. Kossuth became Regent-President of Hungary in 1849. The war ended later that year when the Hungarian forces surrendered to Russia and Austria. Kossuth went into exile, visiting and speaking with officials in the United Kingdom and the United States. He died in exile in Italy. The Lajos Kossuth issue was first Issued in Washington D.C, on September 19, 1958.

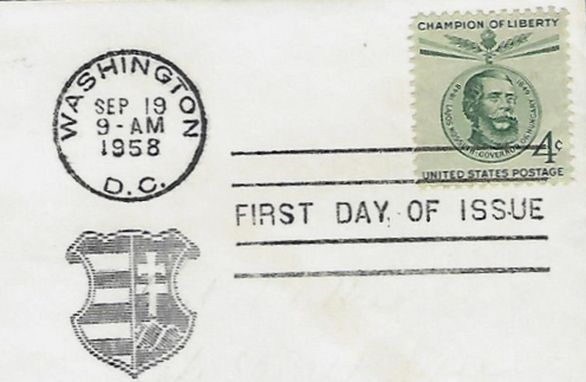
Lagos Kossuth FDC cancellation, September 19, 1958 (detail)

=== Simon Bolivar issue ===
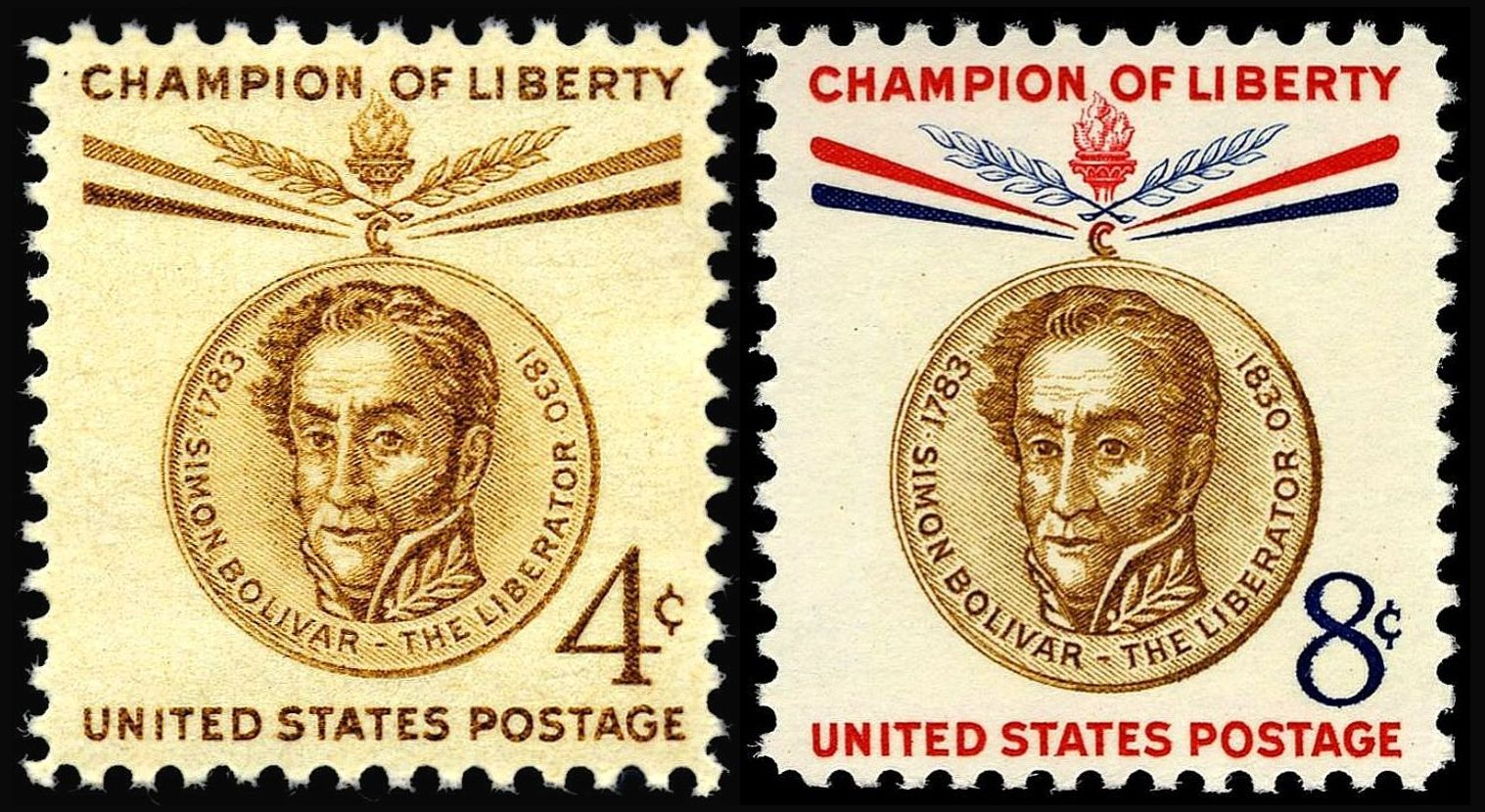
Simon Bolivar, 1958 issues

Simon Bolivar (1783 – 1830) was one of the most influential leaders in the several South American struggles for Independence. Bolivar rallied the different races and ethnic groups together and led Columbia, Panama, Ecuador, Peru, Venezuela and Bolivia to independence from the Spanish Empire, which led to the ultimate transformation of the governments and social structures of South America. The Bolivar issues were first released in Washington DC on July 24, 1958.

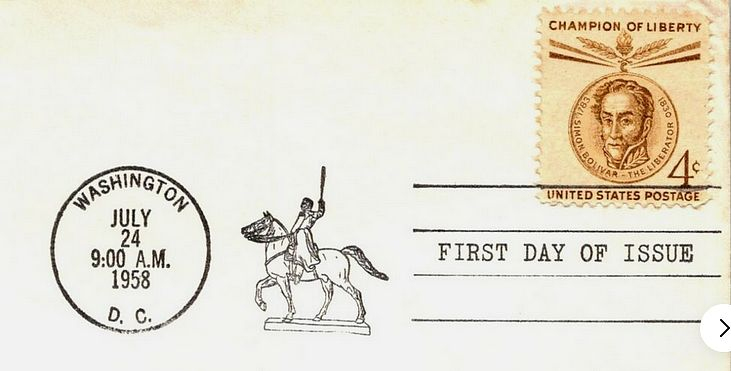
Simon Bolivar, FDC cancellation, July 24, 1958 (detail)

=== Ernst Reuter issue ===
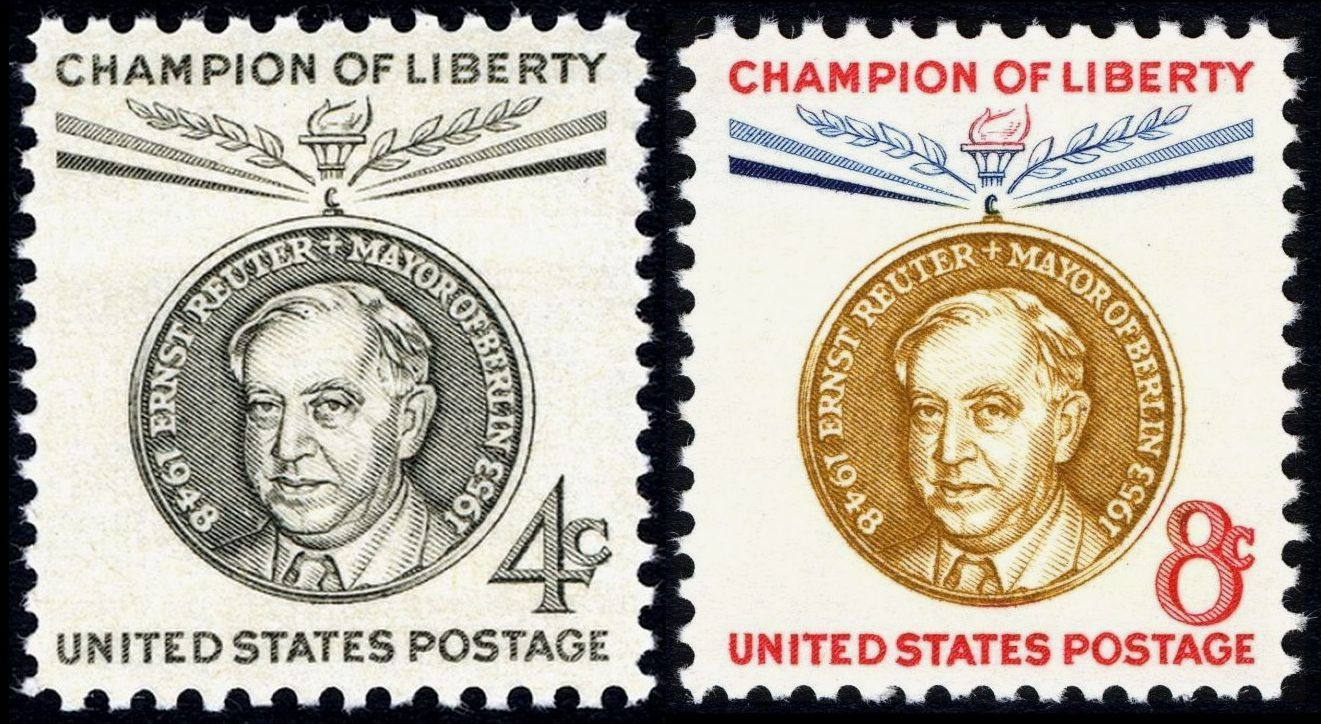
Ernst Reuter, 1959 issues

Ernst Reuter (1889 – 1953) was the Mayor of West Berlin from 1948 to 1953. He was captured and imprisoned by the Nazis in 1933 and release in 1935, after which he went into exile in Turkey, where he remained until the end to the war. He returned to Germany to help rebuild the country. He actively promoted the idea of a unified Berlin and was active in the effort to unify the western sectors. He, assisted with the Berlin Airlift and politically opposed the Soviet Union government. Reuter was the fifth person featured in the Champions of Liberty series, first issued in Washington DC, September 29, 1959.

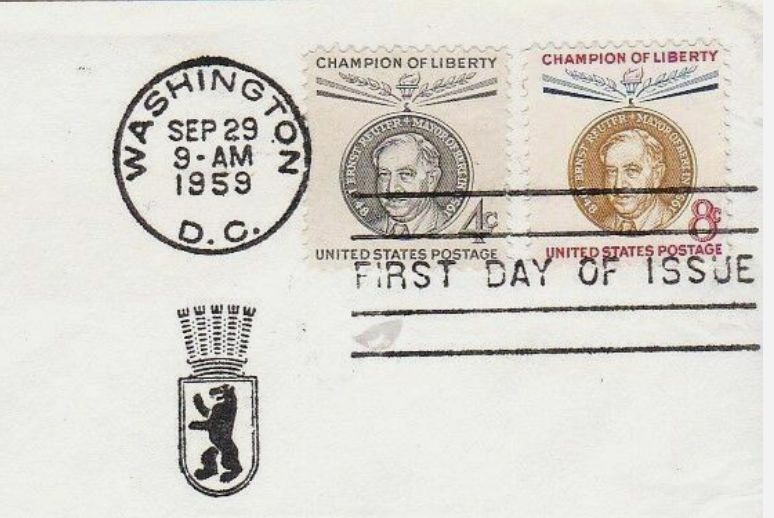
Ernst Reuter "First Day of Issue" cancellation, September 29, 1959 (detail)

=== Jose de San Martin issue ===
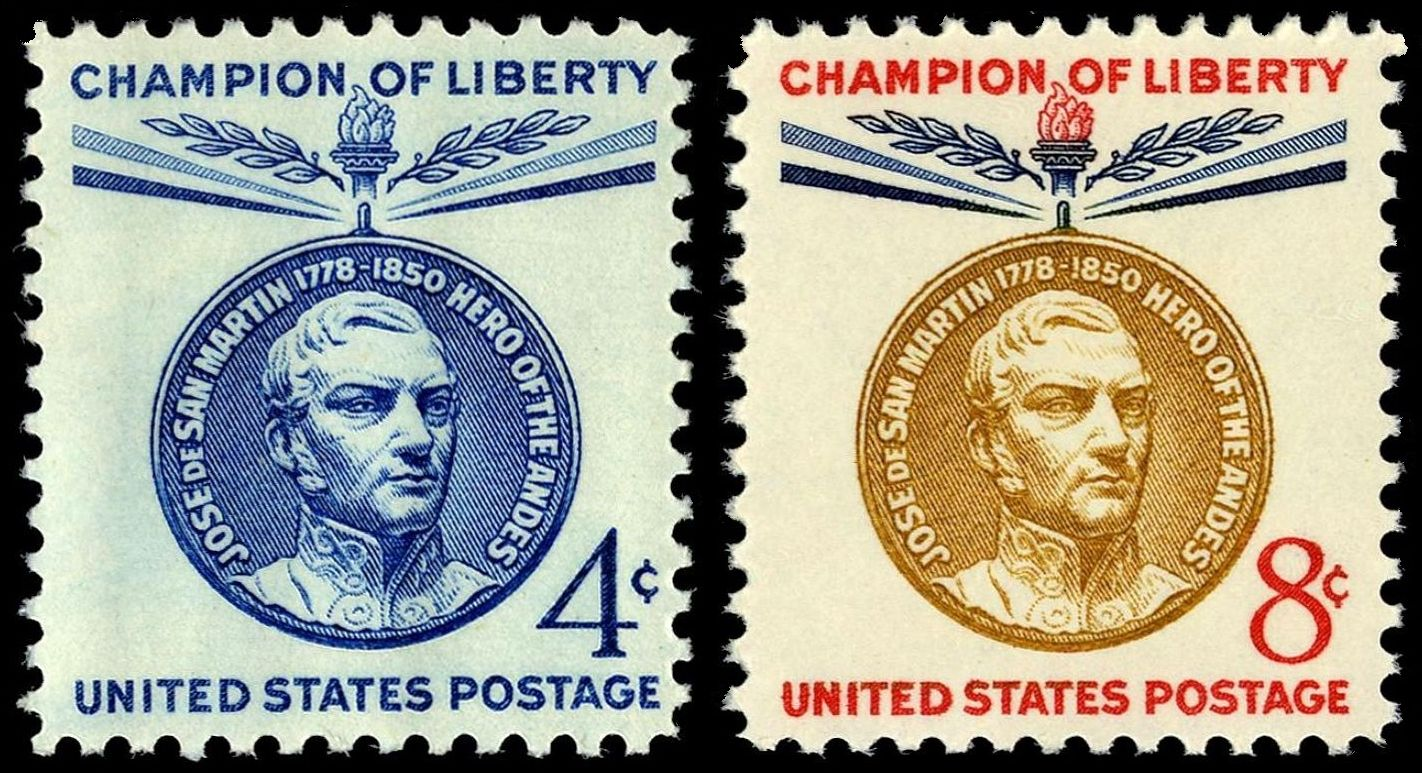
José de San Martín, 1959 issues

José de San Martín (1778 – 1850) was a South American soldier and statesman who played a central role in many South American countries' struggle for independence from Spain. San Martín was born in 1778 in what is now Argentina. He attended school in Spain, served in the Spanish army and then became a leader in the movement for liberation of Spanish possessions in South America, helping Argentina, Chile and Peru gain independence. The San Martín commemorative postage stamps were first issued in Washington DC, February 25, 1959.

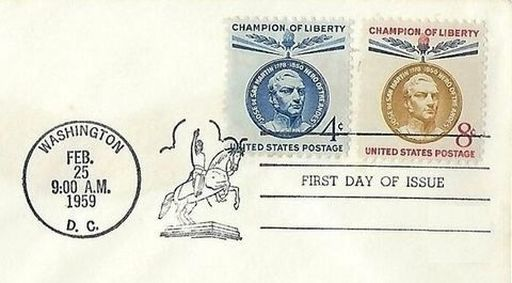
José de San Martín "First Day of Issue" cancellation, February 25, 1959 (detail)

=== Tomáš Masaryk issue ===
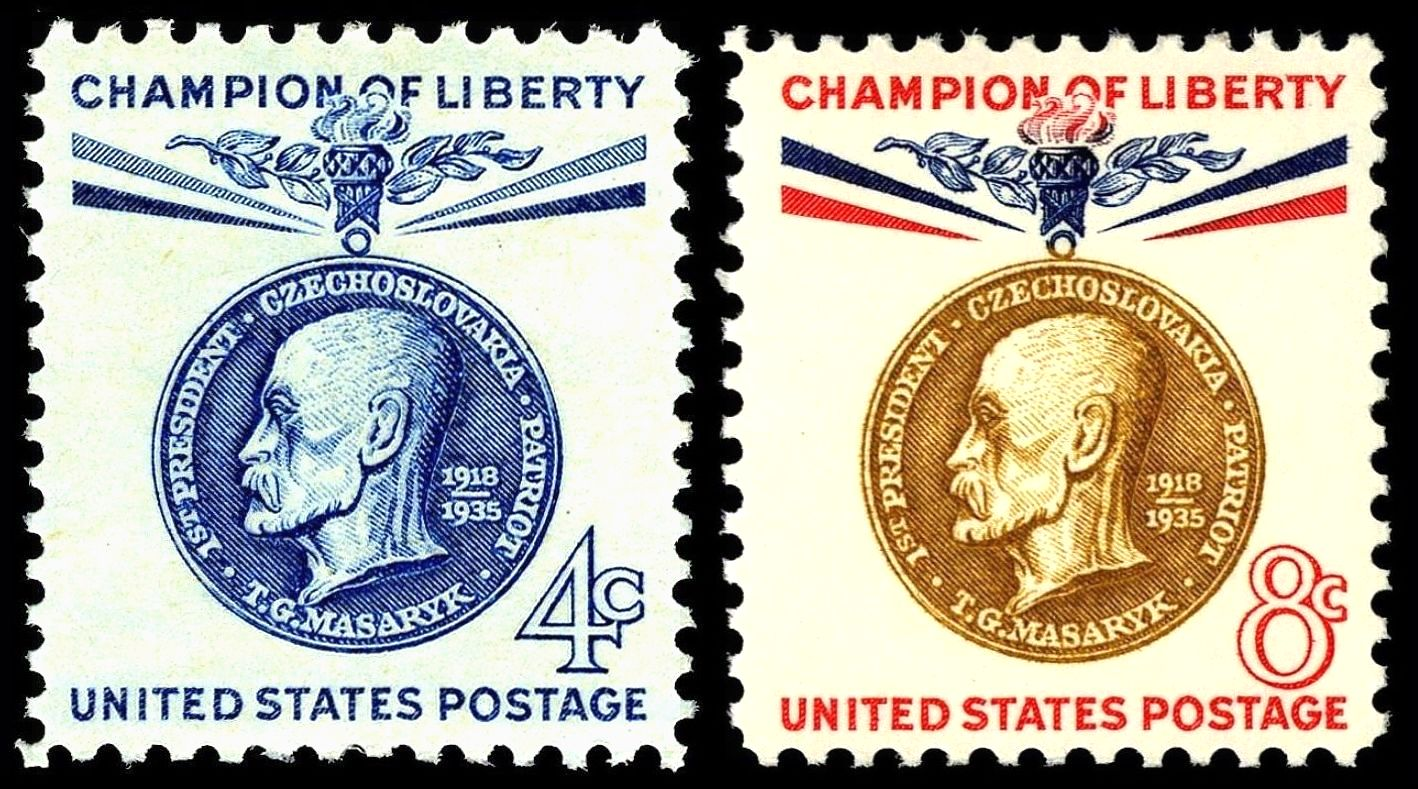
Tomas Garrigue Masaryk, 1960 issues

Tomáš Masaryk, (1850 – 1937) founder and first president of Czechoslovakia from 1918 to 1935. Following the outbreak of the World War I, Masaryk sought for a separate country for Czechs and Slovaks, independent from the Austria-Hungary Empire. The Masaryk issues were first released in Washington D.C. on the 110th anniversary of his birth, February 25, 1959.

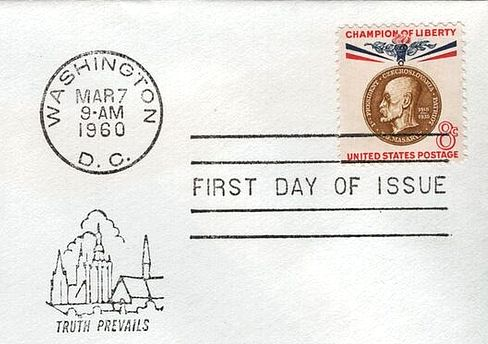
Masaryk, FDC cancellation, February 25, 1959 (detail)

=== Baron Karl Gustaf issue ===
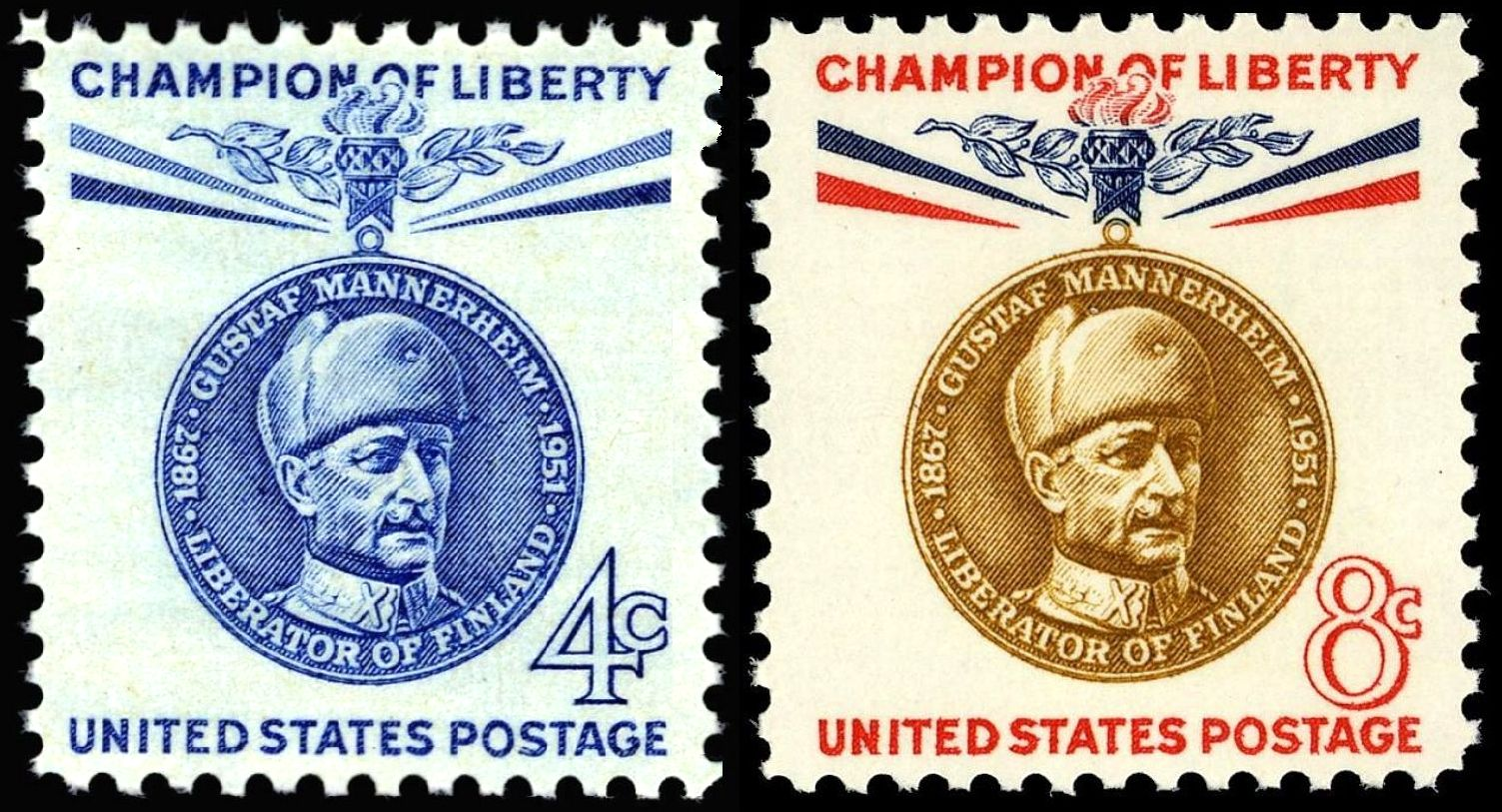
Marshal Mannerheim, 1960 issue

Carl Gustaf Emil Mannerheim (1867 – 1951) served as military leader during the Finnish Civil War and World War II. He was promoted to the honorary rank of Field Marshal for his distinguished service as general. He went on to serve as the sixth President of Finland. The Mannerheim issues were first released in Washington, DC on October 26.1960.

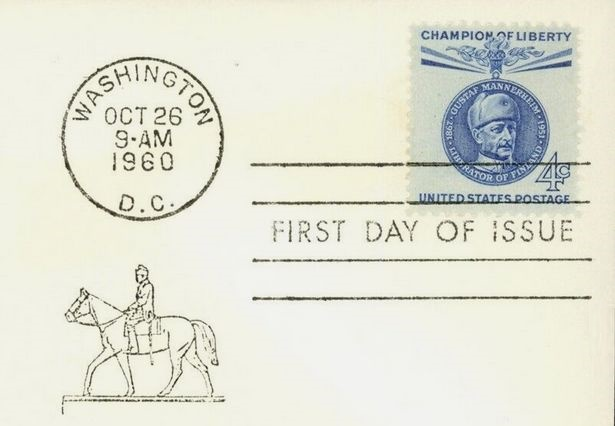
Gustaf Karl Mannerheim, FDC cancellation, October 26, 1960

=== Giuseppe Garibaldi,issue ===
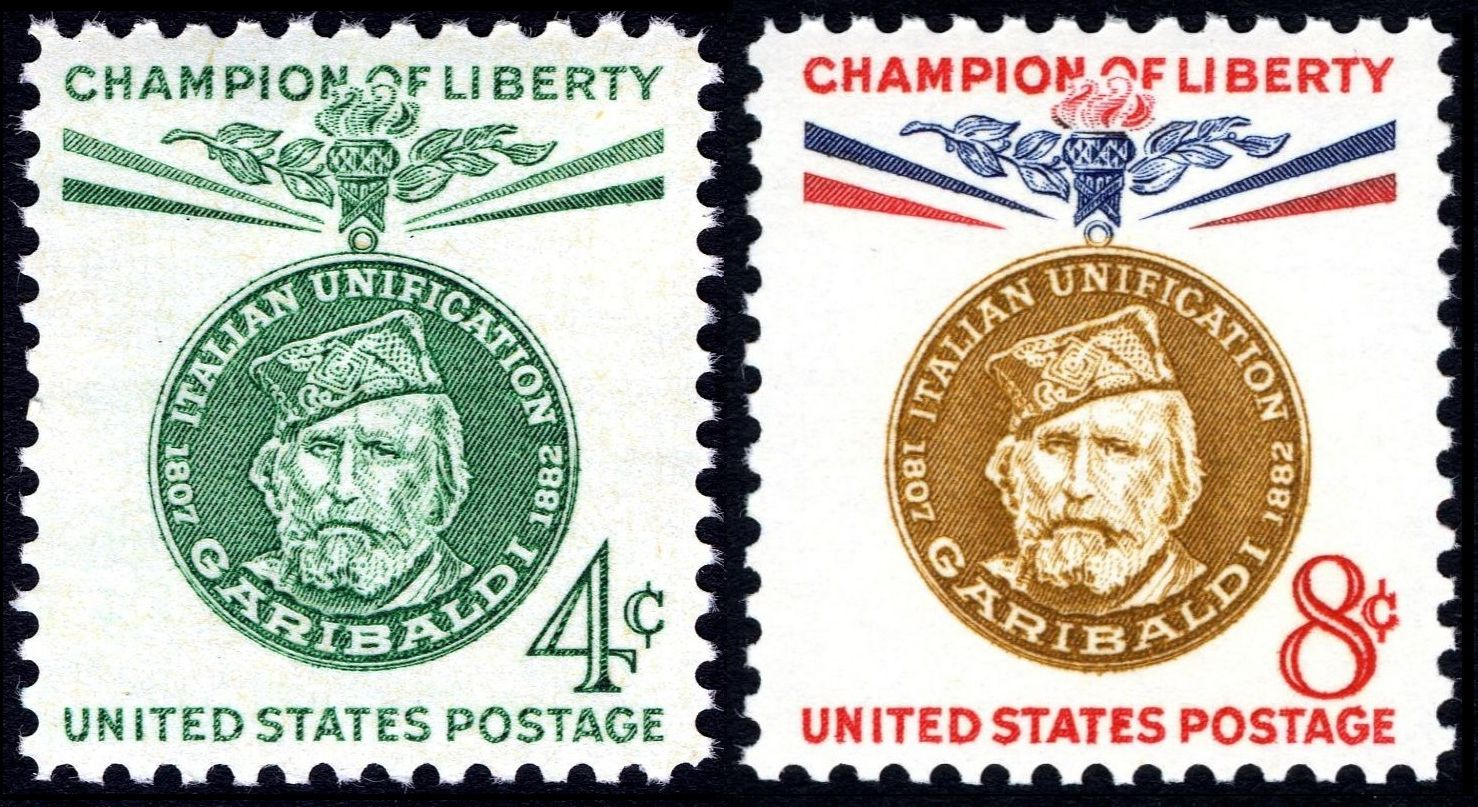
Giuseppe Garibaldi, 1960 issues

Giuseppe Garibaldi was an Italian patriot, known for assisting with the reunification of Italy in the 19th century. He participated in revolutionary struggles of Brazil and Uruguay while in exile in South America. Garibaldi returned to Italy in 1848 to fight in its war of independence. He served in military campaigns against Austria and France. Issue in Washington DC, November 2, 1960.

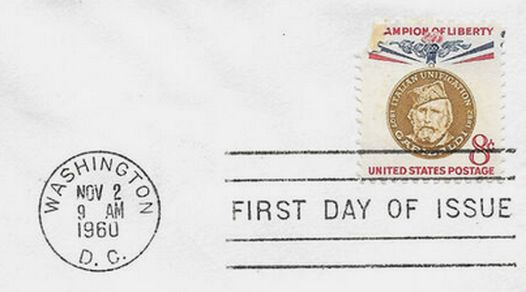
Giuseppe Garibald, FDC cancellation, November 2, 1960

=== Ignacy Jan Paderewski issue ===
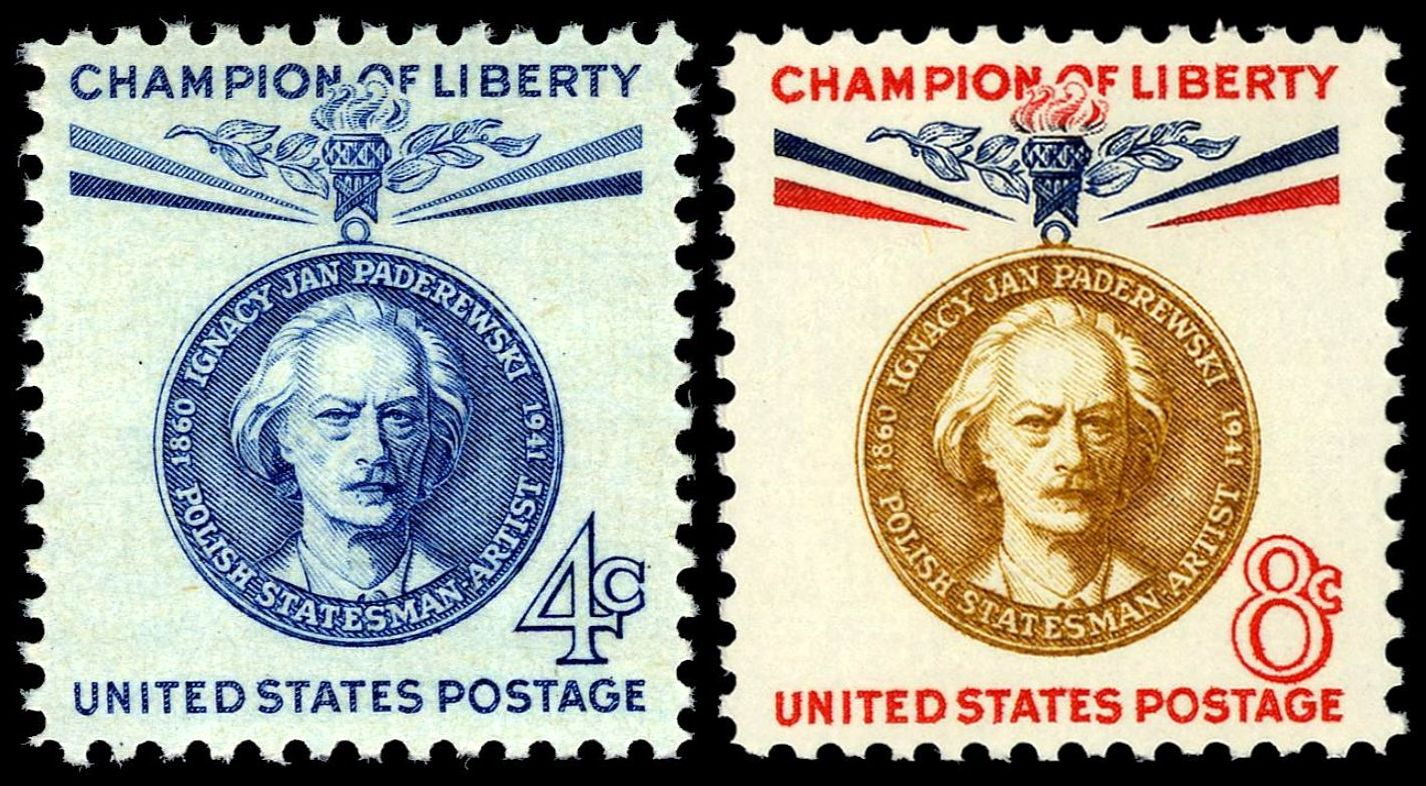
Ignacy Jan Paderewski, 1960 issues

Ignacy Jan Paderewski was an accomplished composer and pianist.before entering politics. As an active member of the Polish National Committee, he served as a representative to Washington who met with President Woodrow Wilson. After the First World War ended, he was appointed Prime Minister of Poland and later served as Polish Ambassador to the League of Nations. During World War II when German forces invaded and occupation Poland in 1939, he became the leader of the Polish National Council, which functioned as a Polish parliament while in exile in London. Paderewski ultimately "welded together" a new Poland. The Paderewski issues were first released in Washington DC on October 8, 1960.

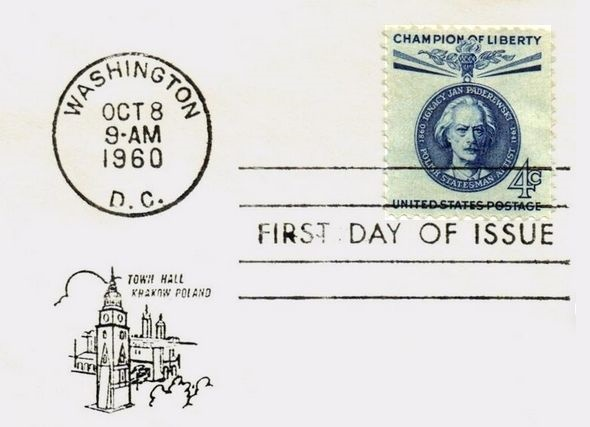
Ignacy Jan Paderewski, FDC cancellation, October 8, 1960

=== Mahatma Gandhi issue ===
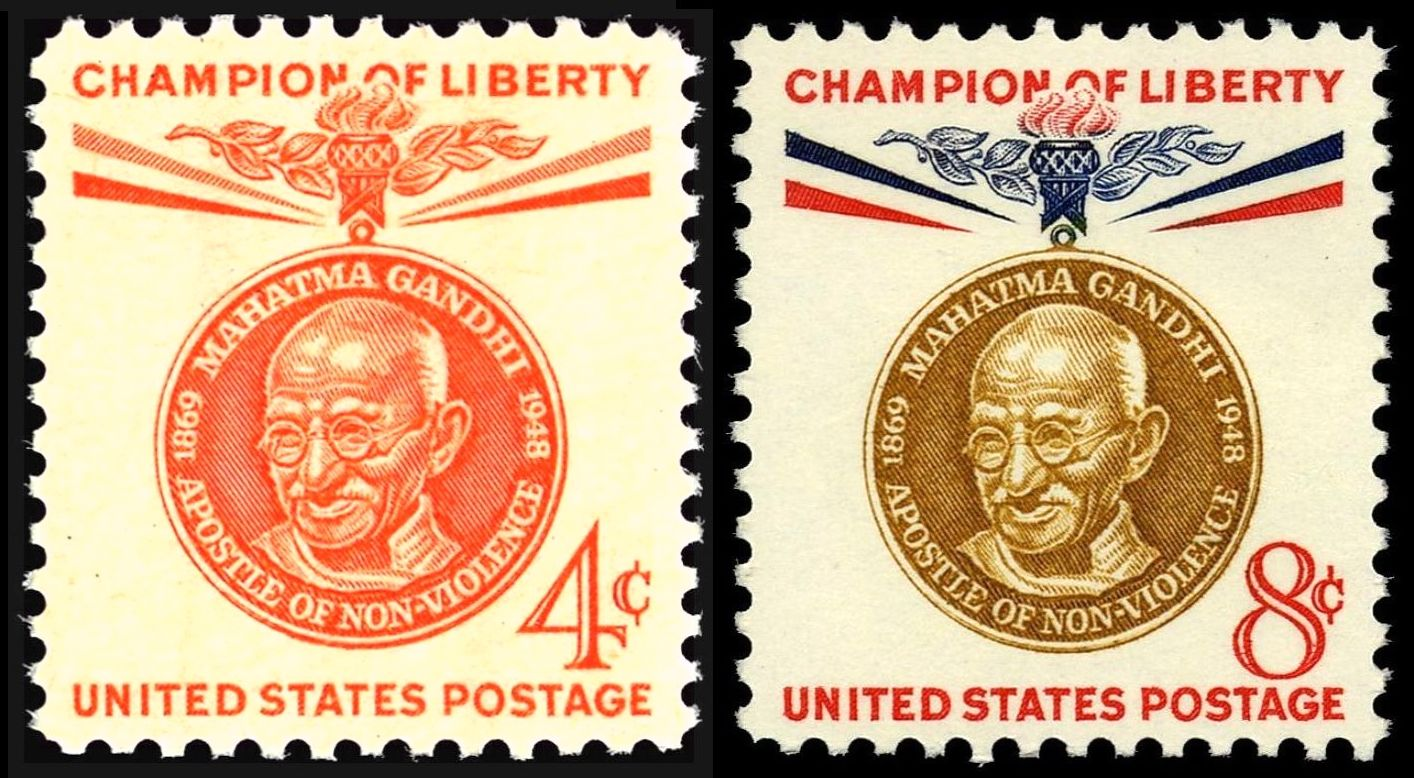
Mahatma Gandhi, 1961 issues

Mahatma Gandhi spent the earlier part of his life advocating for the rights of persons of color in South Africa from 1893 to 1914, where he formed many of his social and political views. In 1915, he began fighting for India's independence through non-violent activism. Gandhi was assassinated in New Delhi on January 30, 1948 by Nathuram Godse, having no belongings other than some clothing and a few other menial items at the time of his death. The Gandhi commemorative stamps were first issued on January 26, 1961, and were the last two stamps issued in the Champion of Liberty Series. They were first issued in the Postmaster General's Reception Room in the Post Office Building in Washington, DC

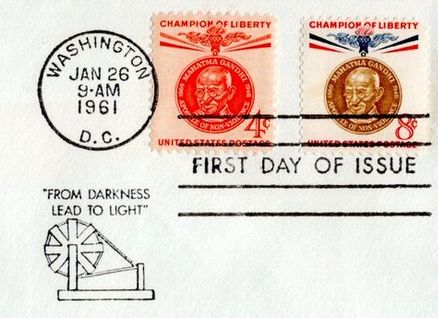
Gandhi, FDC cancellation, October 26, 1961

== See also ==
- Presidents of the United States on U.S. postage stamps
- Army and Navy stamp issues of 1936-1937
- American Credo postal issues

== Bibliography ==
Books:

- Arana, Marie (2013). Bolivar : American liberator. New York: Simon & Schuster. ISBN 978-1-43912-4956.
- Brown, Judith M. (2004). Oxford dictionary of national biography. Vol. XXI. Oxford: Oxford University Press.
- Clements, Jonathan (2012). Mannerheim : president, soldier, spy. London: Haus Publishing. ISBN 978-1-90782-2575.
- Hibbert, Christopher (1966). Garibaldi and his enemies : the clash of arms and personalities in the making of Italy.
- Houseman, Donna, ed. (2015). 2016 Scott Specialized Catalogue of United States Stamps and Covers. Ohio: Amos Media. ISBN 978-0-89487-5045.
- Lynch, John (2009). San Martín : Argentine soldier, American hero. New Haven, Conn.: Yale University Press. ISBN 978-0-300-12643-3.
- Newman, Edward William Polson (1960). Masaryk. London: Campion Press.
- Phillips, Charles (1934). Paderewski, the story of a modern immortal. New York: The Macmillan Company.
- Shanor, Donald (2001). Encyclopedia of nationalism. San Diego, Calif.; London: Academic Press. ISBN 978-0-08054-5240.
- Sperber, Jonathan (2005). The European Revolutions, 1848-1851. Cambridge University Press. ISBN 9780521839075.

Online sources:

- John M., Hotchner (May 24, 2021). "Copying the Champions of Liberty series concept".
- "Champion of Liberty Issues of 1957-1961". Stamp Collecting World. Archived from the original on August 26, 2016.
