= American Credo postal issues =

U.S. postage stamps, 1960–1961

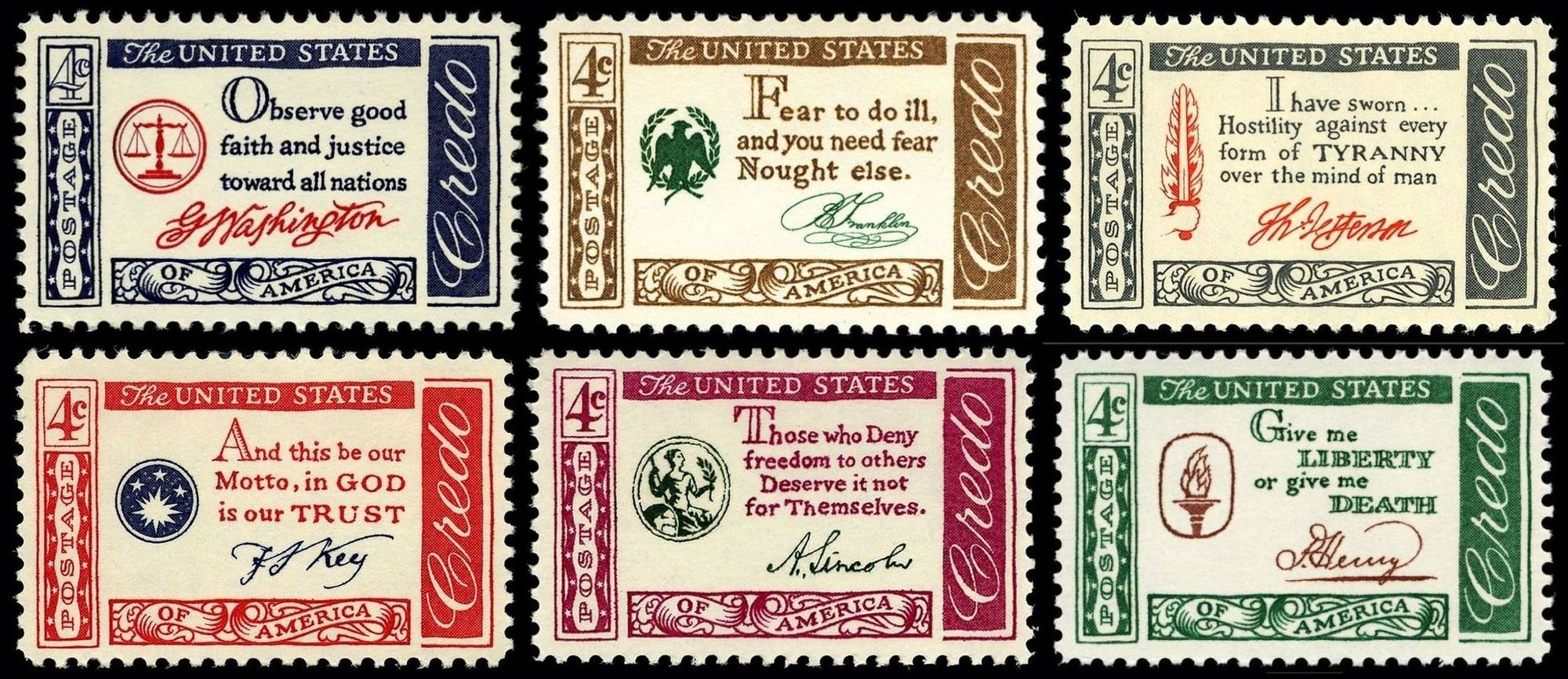
America Credo issues of 1960-1961 Printed by U.S. Bureau of Engraving and Printing

The American Credo postal issues (credo is "I believe..." in Latin) were a series of six commemorative postage stamps issued by the United States Post Office between 1960 and 1961. Issued over a one-year period, the 4-cent stamps feature famous quotes from prominent Americans which are considered to eulogize the principles on which the United States was founded. An opinion poll was taken which consulted one hundred distinguished Americans in public life, which included historians, and presidents of state universities, who collectively chose the given credos found on these stamp issues. The quotes inscribed on the stamps are from George Washington, Benjamin Franklin, Thomas Jefferson, Frances Scott Key, Abraham Lincoln, and Patrick Henry, and were released in that order. Each stamp bears an inscription of the signature of the man who uttered the credo.

== Stamp issues ==
The American Credo stamps were printed by the U.S.Bureau of Engraving and Printing in sheets of fifty. Each of the American Credo stamps paid the postage for a one-ounce letter mailed within the United States.The symbols depicted by the stamp issues relate to the credo inscribed in the stamp designs. Frank P. Conley of New York designed the stamp, issues and Charles R. Chickering modeled the designs. Robert J. Jones was the engraver the of stampdie's frame, and Howard F. Sharpless engraved the vignettes. The first day of issue for the individual stamps occurred at a city or location appropriate to background of the man who uttered the given credo.

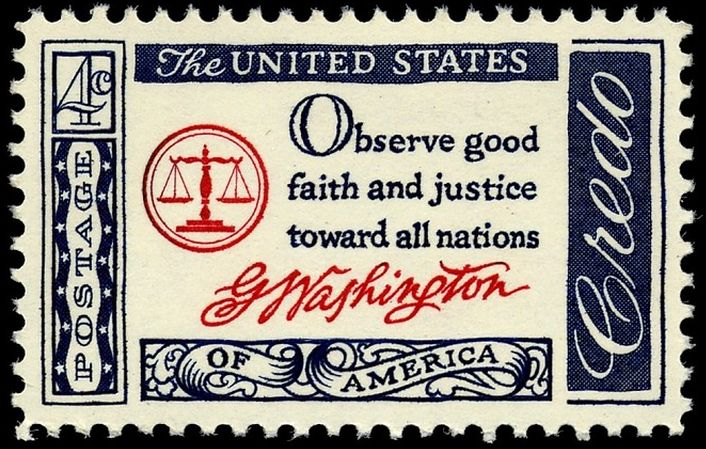

- George Washington — First issued January 20, 1960 at Mount Vernon, Virginia. The Credo inscribed on this stamp is taken from George Washington's Farewell Address, an affirmation he wrote to the American people near the end of his second term. The stamp also depicts a small image of a scale

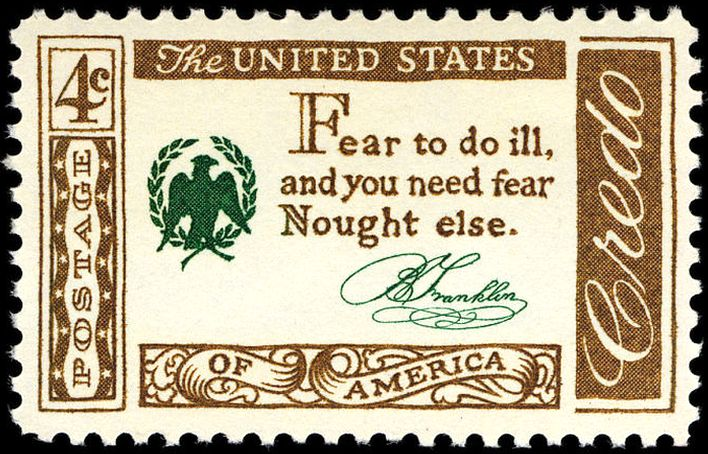

- Benjamin Franklin — First issued March 31, 1960 at the Franklin Institute in Philadelphia. This stamp issue features quote from Benjamin Franklin, "Fear to do ill, and you need fear nought else," taken from his Poor Richard's Almanac, 1740.

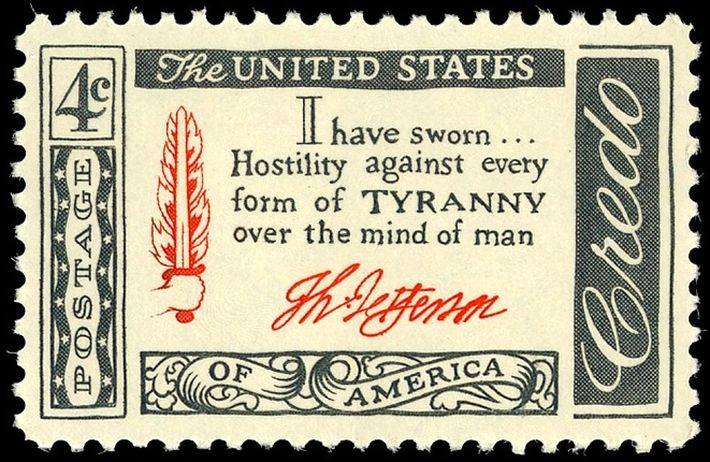

- Thomas Jefferson — First Issued May 8, 1960 at Monticello, the home of Thomas Jefferson. The credo is taken from a letter written by Thomas Jefferson in 1800 to Dr. Benjamin Rush , found in the collected Writings of Thomas Jefferson, volume 10.The stamp also depicts a hand bearing a flaming sword \
  The entire quote reads, "I have sworn upon the altar of God, eternal hostility against every form of tyranny over the mind of man."

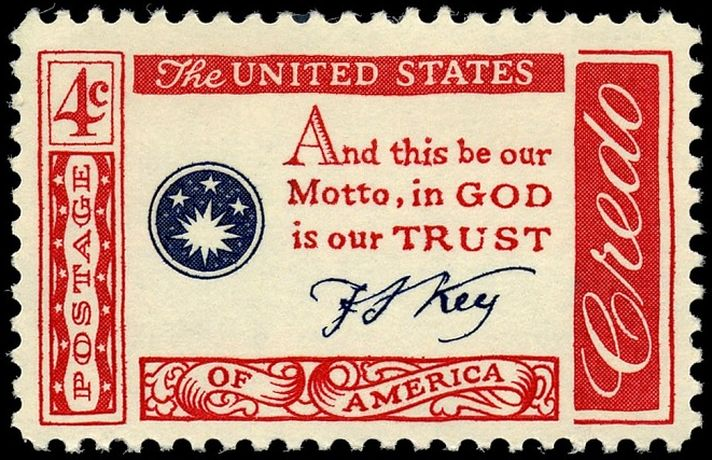

- Francis Scott Key — First issued September 14, 1960 in Baltimore, Maryland. The credo is from Key's poem “Defence of Fort M’Henry,” which later became part of the lyrics of “The Star-Spangled Banner”, which was officially adopted as the national anthem of the United States in 1931.

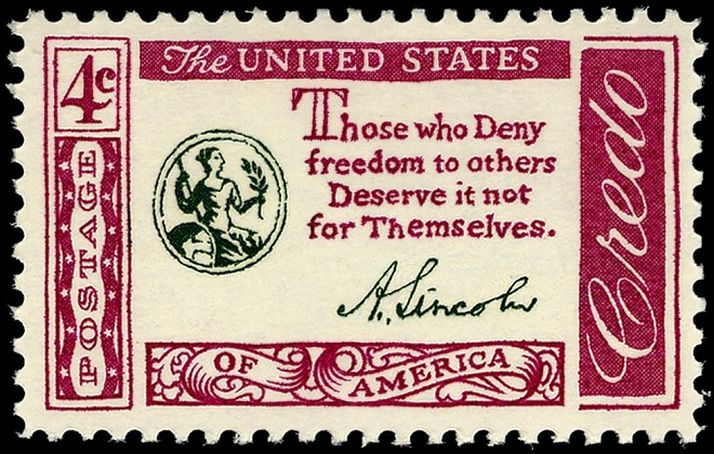

- Abraham Lincoln — First issued November 19, 1960 in New York, NY during the 12th Annual National Postage Stamp Show. The credo is taken from an 1859 letter written by Lincoln to Henry L. Pierce. The stamp also depicts a small image of Lady Freedom

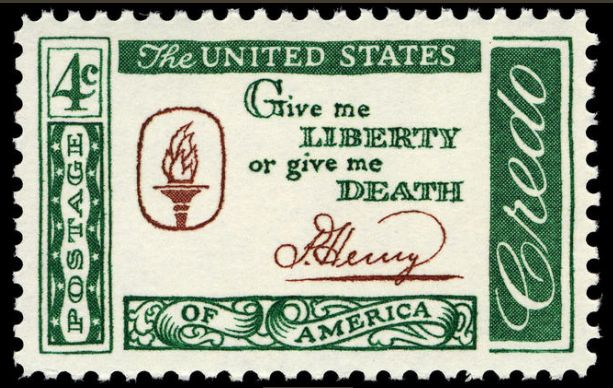
1961 issue honoring Henry in the American Credo series

- Patrick Henry— First issued January 11, 1961 in Richmond, Virginia. This issue has an inscription of the quotation from Patrick Henry, taken from a speech he delivered at the Virginia Convention in 1775. The issue also depicts the torch of freedom.

== See also ==
- Postage stamps and postal history of the United States
- Army and Navy stamp issues of 1936-1937
- Presidents of the United States on U.S. postage stamps
- Champion of Liberty commemorative stamps
- U.S. Postage stamp locator

== Sources ==
- Houseman, Donna, ed. (2015). 2016 Scott Specialized Catalogue of United States Stamps and Covers. Ohio: Amos Media. ISBN 978-0-89487-5045.
- "American Credo Issue". Smithsonian National Postal Museum.
- "American Credo Series". Mystic Stamp Company.
- Jefferson, Thomas (1903). Bergh, Albert Ellery (ed.). The Writings of Thomas Jefferson Jefferson. Vol. X. Washington, D.C: Issued under the auspices of the Thomas Jefferson Memorial Association.
