= List of postage stamps =

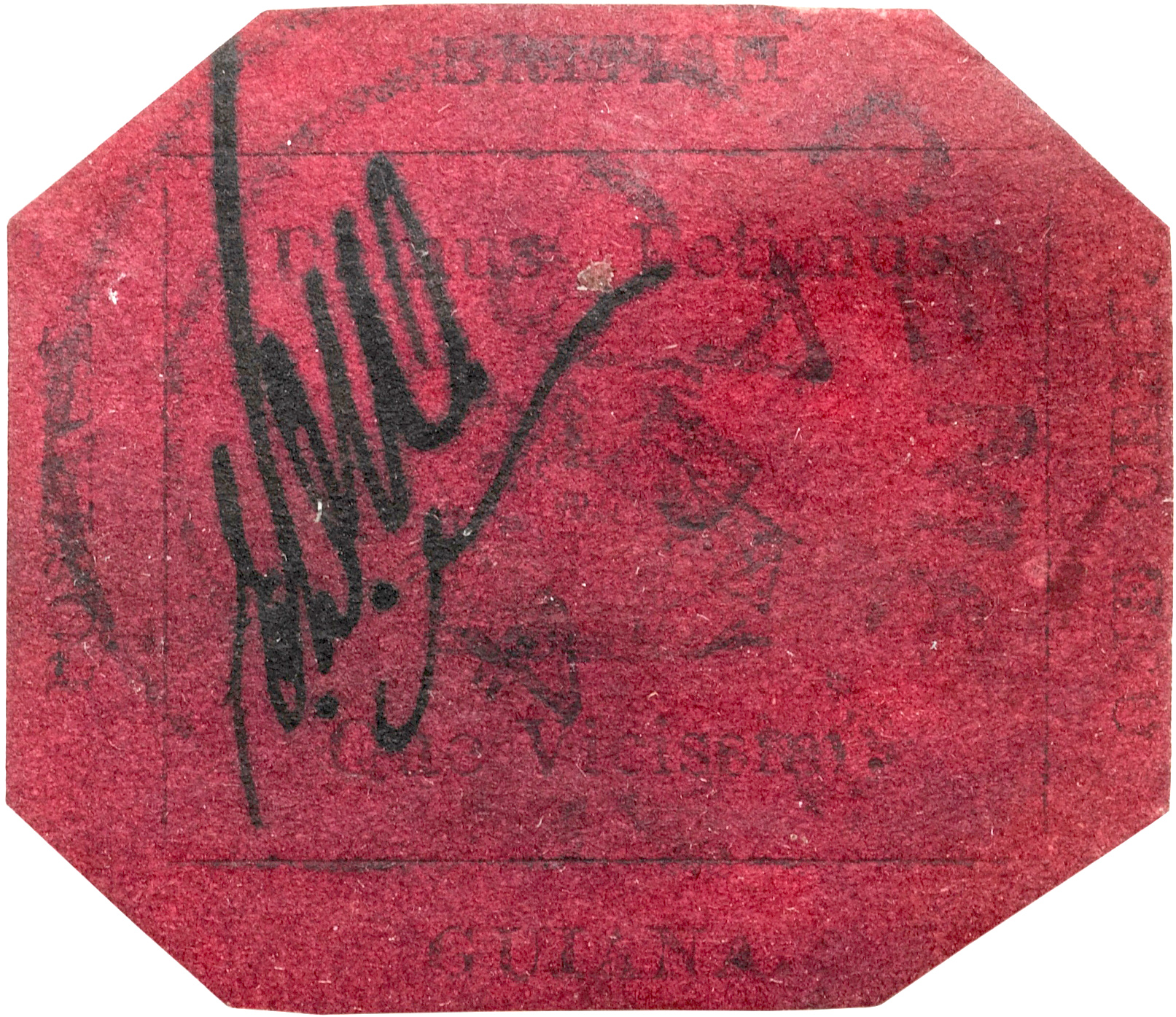
The British Guiana 1c magenta

This is a list of postage stamps that are especially notable in some way, often due to antiquity or a postage stamp error. Among the best-known stamps are:

- Penny Black (1840 - Great Britain)
- Two Penny Blue (1840 - Great Britain)
- Bull's Eye (1843 - Brazil)
- Basel Dove (1845 - Switzerland)
- Mauritius "Post Office" (1847 - British Colony Mauritius)
- British Guiana 1c magenta (1856 - British Guiana)
- Treskilling Yellow (1857 - Sweden)
- Inverted Jenny (1918 - United States)

== Current political entities ==
=== Austria ===
- Red Mercury – newspaper stamp

=== Belgium ===
- Leopold with the Epaulettes (1849)
- Inverted Dendermonde (1920)

=== Brazil ===
- Bull's Eye

=== Canada ===
- Canada 12d black
- Canada 2c Large Queen on laid paper – Rarest Canadian stamp
- Bluenose

=== China ===
- Red Revenues – 1897 provisionals, issued by the Qing dynasty
- The Whole Country is Red – 1968 design error stamp
- Golden Monkey stamp – 1980 Chinese zodiac stamp

=== France ===
- Ceres – France's first stamp

=== Germany ===
- Baden 9 Kreuzer error – stamp printed on blue-green instead of pink paper
- One kreuzer black – issued 1849 in Bavaria, first German postage stamp
- Sachsen 3 Pfennige red – Saxony was the second German state to issue postage stamps
- Vineta provisional – an unauthorized issue
- Yacht issue – a common design of postage stamps for the German colonies

=== India ===
- Scinde Dawk – First stamps in Asia
- Inverted Head Four Annas
- Indian 10 Rupee Mahatma Gandhi postage stamp – Mahatma Gandhi 10 rupees stamp overprinted "SERVICE"

=== Ireland ===
- 1935 Irish 2d coil stamp

=== Italy ===
- Gronchi Rosa

=== Jamaica ===
- Jamaica 1 shilling inverted-frame stamp error
- Jamaica 6d abolition of slavery postage stamp
- Jamaica 1956-58 £1 chocolate and violet
- Jamaica 1968 human rights stamps

=== Malta ===
- Halfpenny Yellow (1860–84) – Malta's first stamp
- Saint Paul 10s black (1919) – one of Malta's rarest stamps
- Melita issue (1922–26) – stamp issue commemorating Malta's self-government

=== Mauritius ===
- Mauritius "Post Office" stamps

=== New Zealand ===
- 1904 Pictorial 4d Lake Taupo invert – Only one copy known

=== Romania ===
- Moldavian Bull's Heads – Issued by the principality of Moldavia in 1858

=== Russia ===
- First stamp of the Russian Empire (1857)
- 70r Red Army Soldier error (1922) – 70-ruble perforated 12.5 or imperforate orange red error; position 72 in part of the issue; 4 imperforate specimens known

=== Sweden ===
- Treskilling Yellow – Unique error, world's record auction sales price for a postage stamp

=== Switzerland ===
- Basel Dove
- Double Geneva
- Zürich 4 and 6

=== Trinidad ===
- Lady McLeod private local post

=== Uganda ===
- Uganda Cowries – The first stamps of Uganda, typewritten

=== United Kingdom ===
- Penny Black (1840) – World's first postage stamp
- Penny Black VR official (1840) – First official stamp
- Penny Blue (1840) – Trial printings from a Penny Black plate
- Two Penny Blue (1840) – Issued for second rate step, at the same time as Penny Black
- Penny Red (1841) – Improved follow-ons to the Penny Black
- Prince Consort Essay (1851) - A surface printed printer's sample stamp
- Penny Lilac (1881) – The most issued Victorian stamp
- Edward VII 2d Tyrian plum (1910) – Withdrawn before issue, but one used
- Postal Union Congress £1 stamp (1929)

==== Falkland Islands ====
- HMS Glasgow error

=== United States ===
- St. Louis Bears (1845-46)
- New York Postmaster's Provisional (1845-47)
- Alexandria "Blue Boy" Postmaster's Provisional (1847) – Unique, entire
- 1c Z grill (1868) – Rarest US stamp
- Lost Continental – 1875 24c Winfield Scott
- Black Bull – Dollar value of the 1898 Trans-Mississippi Issue
- Pan-American invert (1901) - printing error
- Inverted Jenny (1918) – The "upside-down airplane"
- Pagsanjan Falls stamp (1932) – printing error
- Dag Hammarskjöld invert (1962) – Error deliberately mass-produced
- CIA invert (1979) – Modern error
- Legends of the West (1994) - printing error of wrong individual
- Statue of Liberty Forever stamp (2011) – Largest run of an error on a US postage stamp (10.5 billion)

=== Uruguay ===
- 1856, 80c. green, Ferrer block of 15 – Unique

== Former political entities ==
=== British Guiana ===
- British Guiana 1c magenta

=== Ceylon ===
- Dull Rose – A 4 pence denomination issued on 23 April 1859, considered the most valuable stamp of Ceylon

=== Kingdom of Hawaii ===
- Hawaiian Missionaries – First stamps of Hawaii

=== Kingdom of the Two Sicilies ===
- Sicilian Error of Color

=== State of Buenos Aires ===
- Buenos Aires 1859 1p "In Ps" tete-beche pair

=== Western Australia (British colony) ===
- Black Swan
- Inverted Swan

== See also ==
- List of most expensive philatelic items
