= Canada 2c Large Queen on laid paper =

1868 Canadian postage stamp

2¢ Large Queen on laid paper
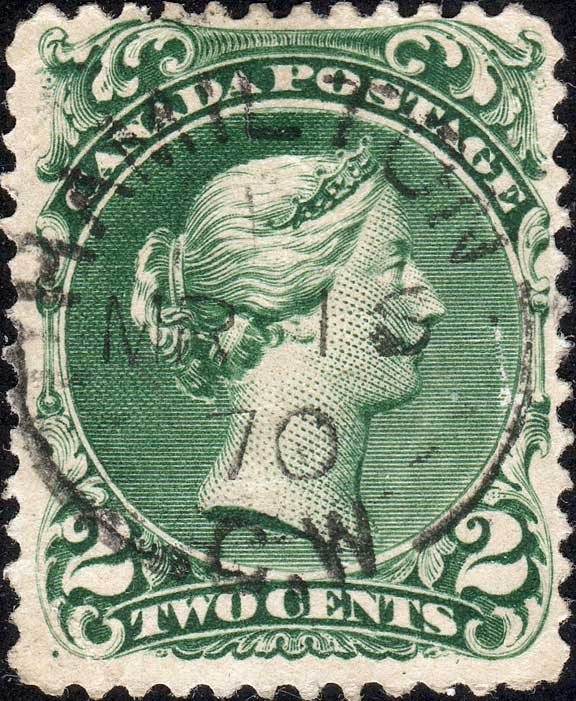
- The third example of Canada's rarest stamp
- Country of production: Canada
- Date of production: 1868
- Nature of rarity: From a rare printing on laid paper
- No. in existence: 3 found so far
- Face value: 2c
- Estimated value: US $125-250,000

The 2¢ Large Queen on laid paper is the rarest postage stamp of Canada. Printed in 1868, it was not discovered until 1925, and so far only three have been found, all used. Many more could exist as at least one sheet must have been printed, and possibly many sheets; however, they may all have been destroyed, or lie unrecognised in stamp collections or on cover.

== Background ==
The Large Queens were the first issue by Canada; they are so-called to distinguish them from the 1870 issues (the "Small Queens") which are similar in appearance but physically smaller. The Large Queens were normally printed on wove paper, but the 1¢, 2¢, and 3¢ values were also printed on the less-desirable laid paper. The 1¢ and 3¢ on laid paper were long-known although uncommon.

The Unitrade Specialized Catalogue of Canadian Stamps lists Scott number 32, the 2c Laid Paper Large Queen, at $250,000. The last auction price recorded is $247,500.

== First copy ==
The stamp was first reported in 1925, although many authorities were dubious, and the Scott catalog did not list it until the 1930s. According to a 2014 BNA Topics First Quarter article by Glenn Archer, the second known example bears a two-ring 5 numeral cancel and was discovered in 1935 in the estate of English stamp dealer JW Westhorpe. According to an 18 November 1971 Globe and Mail article by Douglas Patrick, this example sold for $25,000 to New York dealer Robert Lyman, in the J.N. Sissons' Firth collection auction. In 1986, Vancouver stamp dealer Daniel Eaton acquired this 2c Laid Paper from Stanley Gibbons in London and sold it to Los Angeles stamp dealer George Holschauer for $90,000. The 1971 Globe and Mail article says A.L. Michael of Stanley Gibbons was the underbidder in the 1971 auction. According to Eaton, Gibbons sold the stamp in 1986 on behalf of John Dupont, who collected Canadian stamps using the alias John Foxbridge.

== Second copy ==
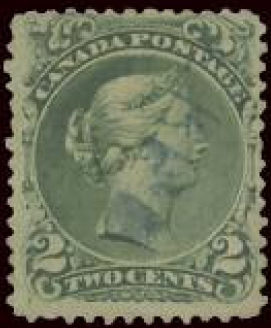
The second copy of the stamp, with Registered cancel.

Kasimir Bileski purchased the second copy of the stamp in the Lewis Reford sale of October 1950 for $3,800. This copy had also been in the Ferrary collection. Daniel Eaton acquired the stamp from Kasimir Bileski then sold/traded this example to John Jamieson for $150,000. Jamieson sold it to Robert Darling Jr. In 1998 it eventually wound up in the award-winning Ron Brigham collection.

A certificate from The Royal Philatelic Society, London Expert Committee states the following:

"No. 18,955 12 Dec 1935 We have examined the enclosed Canada: 1868-72, 2c. pale emerald-green, on laid paper, perf. 12,(SG 57A), used stamp, sent by Dr. Lewis L. Reford. of which a photograph is attached hereto, and are of opinion that it is genuine."

Image reference: Confederation, The Newsletter of the Large and Small Queens Study Group, Number 7, March 1998, pg.4. (This is a study group of the British North American Philatelic Society and .pdf copies of the news letter are available on their website)

This example was offered at auction by Ron Brigham in February 2014. It was estimated at $900,000. and sold for $475,000.

== Third copy discovered ==
It was announced on 16 July 2013 that the Greene Foundation had issued a certificate of genuineness to a Canada Two Cent Large Queen stamp on laid paper, Scott number 32. This is only the third known copy of this stamp and the first copy seen since the two existing copies were expertized in 1935 by the Royal Philatelic Society London. According to a cover story in Canadian Stamp News, the third 2c Laid Paper was found in an American Philatelic Society salesbook and purchased for less than $5.

Vincent Graves Greene Philatelic Research Foundation Certificate No. G 20118 states the following:

"Date June 24, 2013
Comments: Canada Scott No. 32, used, on horizontal laid paper, .0036 in.
thick, genuine, two diagonal creases, internal tear on right side, dated
Hamilton MR 16, 1870."

A 2014 First Quarter BNA Topics article, however, states that the price was $60 and the purchaser was American collector Michael D. Smith. The stamp is creased and torn and bears an 1870 "Hamilton C W" (Canada West) cancel. This example realized $215,000. plus 15% buyers premium, ($247,250) in the 18 October 2014 Eastern Auction held by Gary Lyon.

== See also ==
- Canada 12d black
- List of notable postage stamps
- Postage stamps and postal history of Canada
