= Postal Union Congress =

Main international meeting of the Universal Postal Union

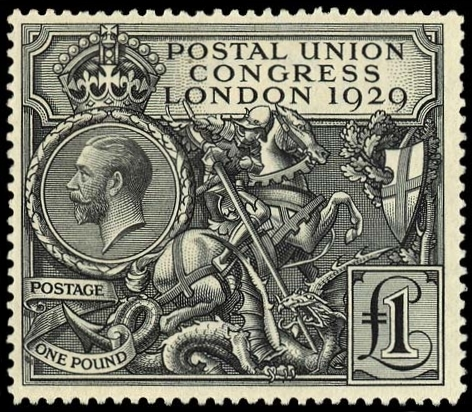
The British £1 stamp for the 1929 Postal Union Congress, designed by Harold Nelson.

The Postal Union Congress is the main international meeting of the Universal Postal Union, used to discuss various issues affecting international postal services, such as legislation, the political climate, and other strategic issues. The first congress was held in Bern, Switzerland in 1874, and was attended by delegates from 22 countries, most of them European. The meetings are normally held every four years, although they were cancelled during the two World Wars. Extraordinary Meetings can also be called outside the four-year cycle.

Delegates are usually presented with special albums of stamps by the other participating countries, to cover the period since the previous congress.

== Quadrennial Congresses ==
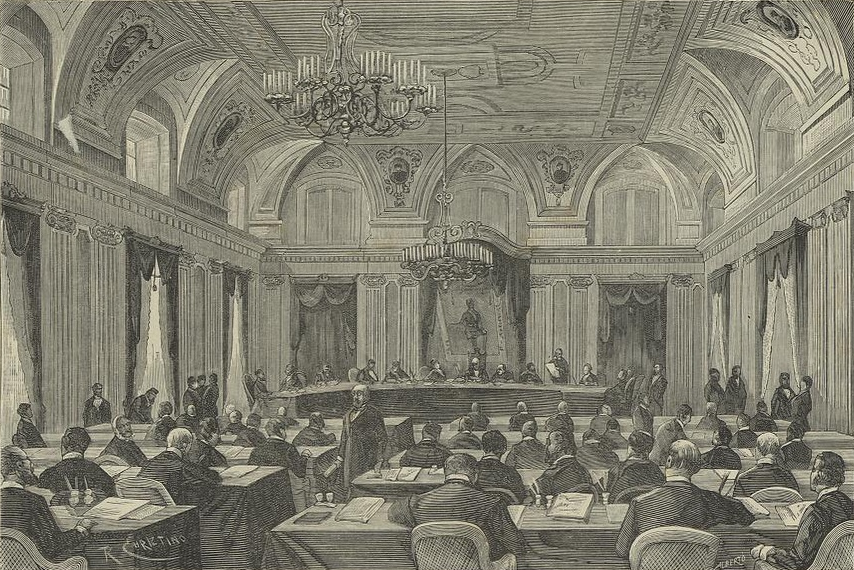
Session of the Postal Union Congress in 1885, in the hall of the Supreme Court of Justice, Lisbon

Number	Year	Location	Topic
1st	1874	Bern, Switzerland	System of base rates developed.
2nd	1878	Paris, France	Colour coding of postage stamps, international parcel post service proposed by Germany.
3rd	1885	Lisbon, Portugal	Reply-paid postcards authorised.
4th	1891	Vienna, Austria-Hungary	Rules about Paquebots.
5th	1897	Washington, D.C., United States	Cheaper international postage.
6th	1906	Rome, Italy	Free postage for prisoners of war.
7th	1920	Madrid, Spain	Meter mail and window envelopes approved.
8th	1924	Stockholm, Sweden	
9th	1929	London, United Kingdom	Postage paid franking approved, first airmail regulations.
10th	1934	Cairo, Egypt	
11th	1939	Buenos Aires, Argentina	Introduction of Fonopost.
12th	1947	Paris, France	UPU becomes the specialized agency of the United Nations.
13th	1952	Brussels, Belgium	Approval of Aerogrammes.
14th	1957	Ottawa, Canada	
15th	1964	Vienna, Austria	
16th	1969	Tokyo, Japan	
17th	1974	Lausanne, Switzerland	
18th	1979	Rio de Janeiro, Brazil	
19th	1984	Hamburg, West Germany	
20th	1989	Washington, D.C., United States	
21st	1994	Seoul, South Korea	
22nd	1999	Beijing, People's Republic of China	
23rd	2004	Bucharest, Romania	
24th	2008	Geneva, Switzerland	Original location was Nairobi, Kenya. Postponed due to political unrest after elections in 2007.
25th	2012	Doha, Qatar	
26th	2016	Istanbul, Turkey	
27th	2021	Abidjan, Ivory Coast	Postponed from 2020 due to the COVID-19 pandemic
28th	2025	Dubai, United Arab Emirates	

== Extraordinary Congresses ==
Number	Year	Location	Topic
1st	1900	Bern, Switzerland	25th anniversary of the UPU
2nd	2018	Addis Ababa, Ethiopia	Sustainability of the postal sector
3rd	2019	Geneva, Switzerland	Remuneration of small packets
4th	2023	Riyadh, Saudi Arabia	Opportunities to expand membership
