= Ken Rowe =

Ken or Kenneth Rowe may refer to:

- Ken Rowe (baseball)
- Ken Rowe (footballer)
- Kenneth Rowe (North Korean defector), fighter pilot originally called No Kum-Sok
- Kenneth Rowe (philatelist)
- Kenneth Thorpe Rowe, English professor
