= Postage stamps and postal history of Argentina =

Argentine postage stamps were first issued in 1858 by the Argentine Confederation and nationally by the new Republic's National Postal Service in 1862. Due to the continuing civil wars, a number of provinces and territories, particularly in the then-remote far north and far south, continued to issue their own postage brands and stamps for some time, afterwards; some of these issues have since become collector's items.

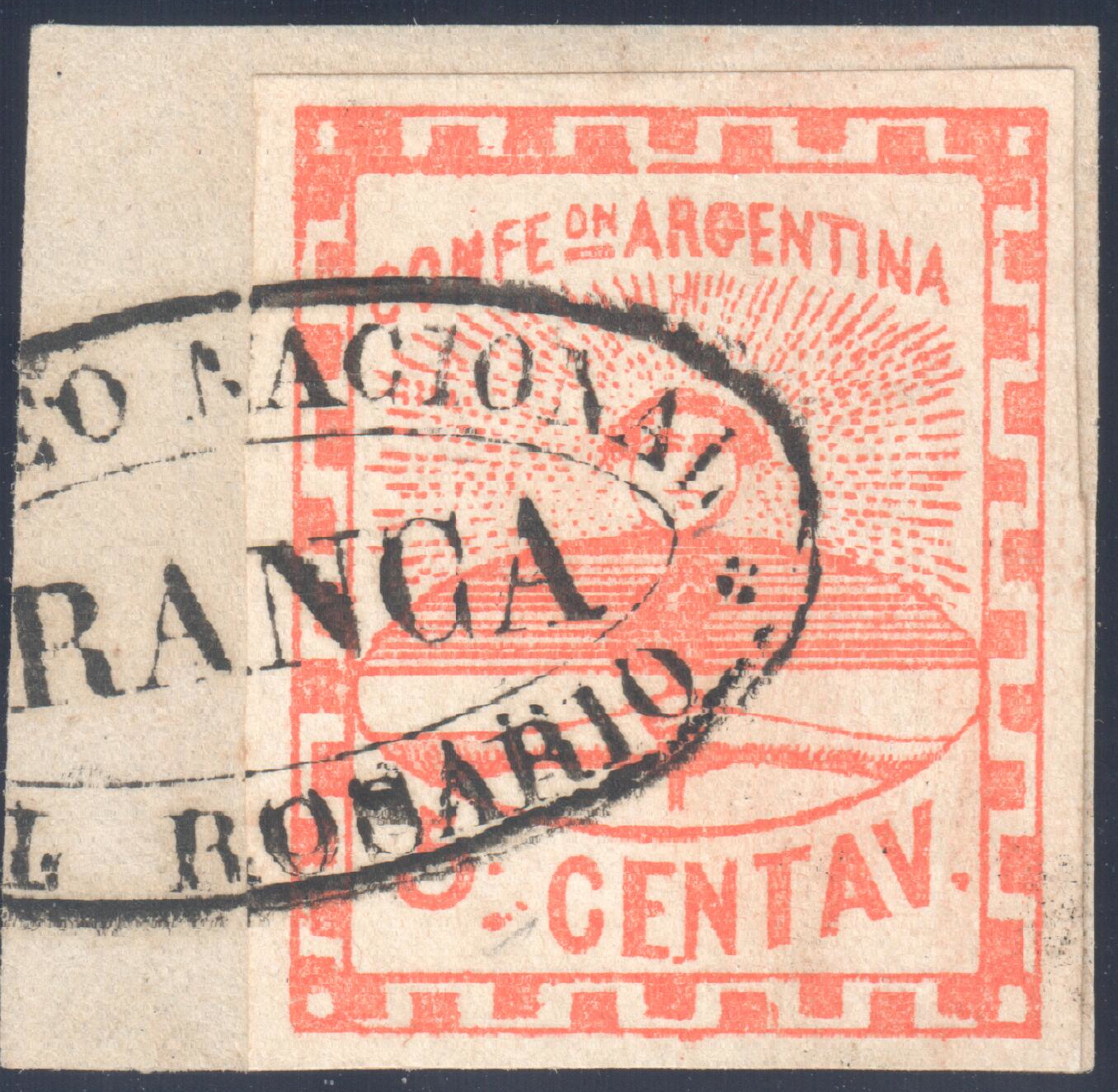
Argentina 1858, first federal stamp

== After independence ==
After independence, the postal service remained much as it had been under Spanish rule. Following the Treaty of Pilar in 1821 the new government placed the postal service under a commission, appointed Manuel Joaquín de Albarracín as commissioner, hired Marcos Prudant as Postmaster General and provided him with an assistant. The first new edict established the postal uniform of a jacket with yellow buttons and a stiff collar. Boots were to be black, and the employee should wear a metal escutcheon on his hat displaying the new county's coat of arms. The edict further decreed that each post rider was to have a horn which should blown 800 m (1/2 mi) or so (ten cuadra) before arriving at the town center, and again just before departure.

In 1826 Juan Manuel de Luca was appointed Postmaster General by the Rivadavia government, under the oversight of an enlarged commission. Despite the demise of that government, and the civil war, the postal service was only minorly inconvenienced and Luca remained at his post until 1858 when he resigned because of his age and health. It was under Luca that detailed regulations were developed; concessions, vehicles, routes, and frequencies set.

Gervasio Posadas managed the post from 1858 to 1874; he introduced revised rates, post office mailboxes, established the stamp program, and in 1860 he inaugurated the first telegraph service.

== Early provincial stamps ==
The first period in the political history of Argentine postage stamps is the so-called “Classical” one between the first stamps (1856) and the first commemorative ones (1892). The earliest Argentine stamps were issued by the separate provinces of Corrientes (1856–1880) and Córdoba (1859–1862), and the State of Buenos Aires (1858–59). The mere existence of these provincial stamps reflects the reality that Argentina was hardly a single organized country in that period, but rather a loose federation of some very independent provinces. Early stamps of Buenos Aires were forged by Oswald Schroeder and a paper by Edward Denny Bacon on the subject appeared in The London Philatelist.

== Corrientes ==
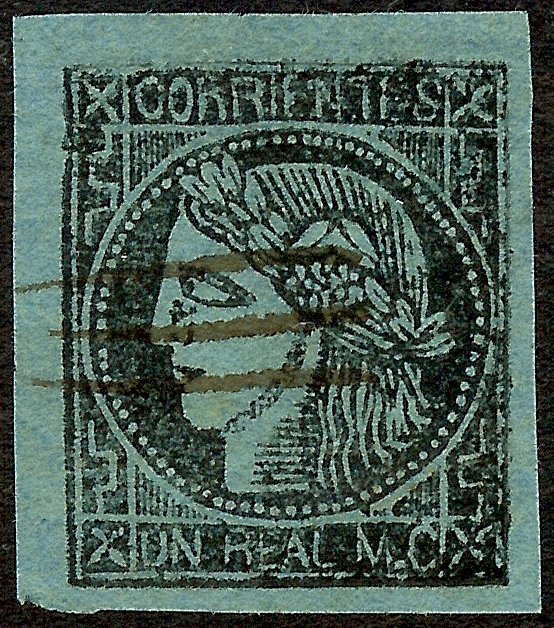
Corrientes 1 real stamp, 1856

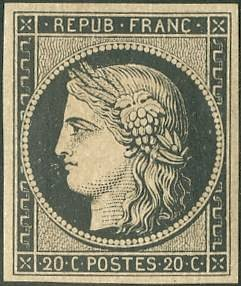
France Ceres issue 1849 for comparison

Corrientes, a province in north-east Argentina, issued postage stamps from 1856 to 1878. The stamps were printed by typography and were crude copies of the first issue of stamps from France, which depicted the profile head of Ceres, the Roman goddess of agriculture. They were individually engraved by hand, so that each die is noticeably different, and were printed in small sheets. All stamps were printed on brightly colored paper. The first stamp, issued in 1856, bore the denomination of one real in the lower panel. In 1860, the denomination was marked out by pen and the stamp was revalued at 3 centavos. Beginning in 1860, the value panel was erased and six more stamps were issued in two, three and (briefly) five centavos denominations, distinguished only by the color of the paper used. As locally produced "primitives", the early Corrientes stamps have long been prized by collectors. After 1880, stamps of Argentina were used.

Louis Stich, an expert on the Corrientes stamps, has explained the origin of the issue as follows: In 1856 there was an extreme shortage in paper or coins under 8 Reales. At the same time, the Corrientes Assembly authorized stamps for pre-paid postal use. The State Printing Bureau decided to print stamps to serve both for postal use and for small change. The director of the State Printing Bureau, Paul Emile Coni, supposedly could not locate anyone capable of cutting the stamp dies. At that time, a baker’s delivery boy, Matias Pipet, who had served as an apprentice to an engraver in Italy before arriving in Corrientes, said he could undertake the task. Coni, for reasons unknown, selected the French Ceres stamp as the design and the boy prepared the designs. The dies produced were "so extremely crude" that Coni was afraid to use them, but he eventually decided that he had no choice as the need for the stamps was urgent. Stich observed that "with each re-telling" of this story, "more fiction seems to replace the original facts."

== The first Argentine stamp ==
The first stamp of Argentina as a nation was a rather crude lithographed seal of the Confederation (Scott #1 to 4) in 1858, followed in 1862 by the seal of the Argentine Republic (Scott #5 to 7). From 1864 to the first commemorative in 1892 a total of 24 different designs were issued. The majority of these stamp designs were small portraits of famous men, principally of the Independence period. The stamps do not identify these heroes of independence, so they would have meant little to anyone who was not familiar with Argentine history. Bushnell has analyzed the “próceres” appearing on these stamps, and concludes that they were primarily of the “liberal” current in Argentine political history, reflecting the principal trend after the fall of the dictator Juan Manuel de Rosas in 1852. The dominant figure was one of the major figures of Argentine liberalism, Bernardino Rivadavia (Scott #61).

== The Popper locals ==
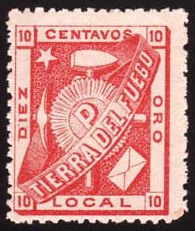
1891 Tierra del Fuego "Popper" stamp

One locally used postage stamp from this period bears mentioning because it shows Argentina's lack of national consolidation in the nineteenth century, especially in the distant reaches of the territory: the Tierra del Fuego local stamps. These were issued by a Rumanian mining engineer named Julius Popper, who in 1891 prepared his own postage stamps to cover the cost of postage from the scattered mining camps of Tierra del Fuego to the closest points of the Argentine or Chilean postal system in Sandy Point (Punta Arenas), on the Strait of Magellan, or Ushuaia on the Beagle Channel. The Popper locals were not recognized by the central government in Argentina or Chile, which required that their own stamps be added once letters from the Popper mining camps entered their postal system. The stamp itself is well-designed, with mining tools, the “Tierra del Fuego” label, and a partially hidden letter “P” for Julius Popper.

== Argentine stamps since 1900 ==
Portraying historical political and military figures like José de San Martín, Guillermo Brown and (during the early 1950s) deceased First Lady Eva Perón, Argentine postage issues remained little changed in their conservative, generally Art Nouveau aspect for much of the twentieth century.

Between October 1935 and the mid-1950s Argentina produced stamps known as the "Patriots and Natural resources issue". The low values illustrate major Argentinian patriots, such as former President Bernardino Rivadavia and the high value denominations show a selection of the country's natural resources that were the major contributors to the Argentine economy during the period. The series was printed on several papers; watermarked paper have the letters RA-for 'Republica Argentina' inside a circle, with rays surrounding the circle, while the unwatermarked papers vary in color and thickness.

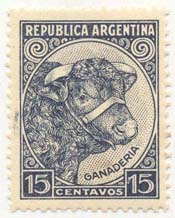
1935: honoring the economic contributions of livestock ranching

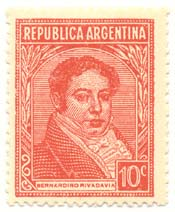
1935: former President Bernardino Rivadavia

In 1946, President Juan Perón nationalized the British-owned postal and telegraph services (many of their quintessentially British red mail drop boxes can still be seen in Buenos Aires, today). His Ministry of Public Services created what would later become EnCoTel (the "National Postal and Telegraph Entity") and, until its dissolution in 1997, this authority issued all Argentine postage stamps.

Argentine postage has, since the original facility's 1881 opening, been printed at the National Mint. One of the largest in the world, it also prints stamps and currency for a number of smaller Latin American nations, such as Bolivia, as well as other financial instruments.

== Return to democracy ==
The conclusion of Argentina's last military regime in 1983 brought with it, among other things, a radical departure in the design of both currency and stamps. Argentine stamps have since been much more varied in style and theme, depicting zoological and phytological diagrams, art of various movements, photographic scenes of daily life and more unconventional subject matter.

A number of stamps were issued to celebrate the return to democracy after the military government with the inaugural of President Raúl Alfonsín (in office from 10 December 1983 to 9 July 1989). Culturally close to Argentina, Uruguay issued a stamp commemorating Alfonsín's state visit to that neighboring nation in November 1986.

== Postal stationery ==
The first items of postal stationery to be issued by Argentina were envelopes in 1876 followed by newspaper wrappers and postcards in 1878. Lettercards were issued in 1888 and aerogrammes were first issued in 1963.

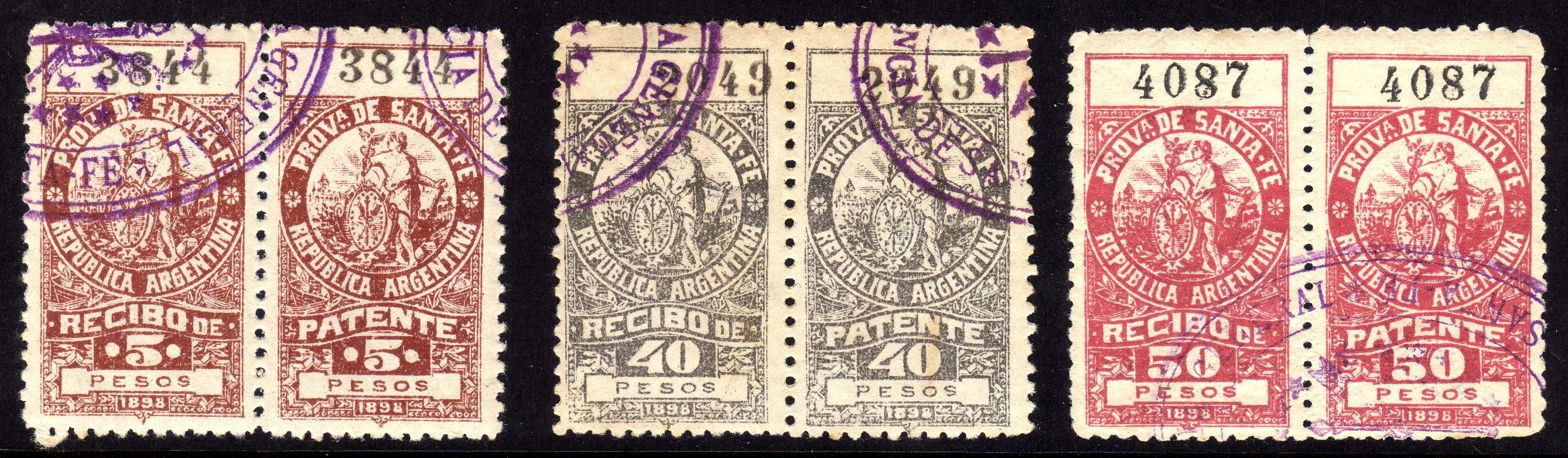
1898 revenue stamps of Santa Fe province in Argentina

== Revenue stamps ==
A very wide range of revenue stamps have been issued in Argentina, from national and local government.

== See also ==
- Fonopost

== References and sources ==
Notes

Sources

- Jack Child, "The Politics and Semiotics of the Smallest Icons of Popular Culture: Latin American Postage Stamps", Latin American Research Review, Vol. 40, no. 1, February 2005.
- Philatelic Magazine, “Engraved by a Baker’s Roundsman," 31 October 1958, pp. 731-2.
- David Bushnell, "Postal Images", Studies in Latin American Popular Culture, no. 1, 1982, p. 92-93.
- Otto Hornung, “The Man from Tierra del Fuego," Stamp Collecting, July 1982, pp. 598-605.
- Jere Hess Barr, “History of the Tierra del Fuego Stamp," Philatelic Congress Book, (Washington: PAU, 1943), pp. 89–101.
