= Canada 12d black =

1851 Canadian postage stamp

Twelve Penny Black The Black Empress of Canada
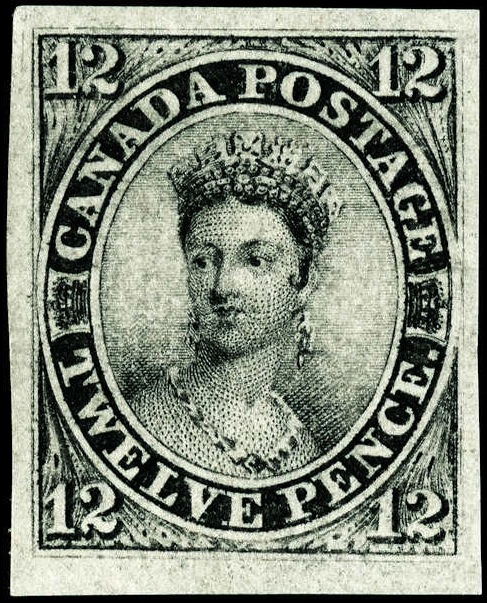
- 1851 12d stamp of Queen Victoria
- Country of production: Canada
- Location of production: New York
- Date of production: 14 June 1851
- Nature of rarity: few exist
- No. in existence: about 120
- Face value: 12 pence
- Estimated value: up to $425,500 (2011)

Canada 12d black or The Black Empress of Canada is one of Canada's rarest postage stamps. Originally issued in 1851, the 12-pence stamp is a portrait of Queen Victoria that was released as the third stamp by the Province of Canada.

== History ==
In 1851, the Province of Canada (Note: Today this is approximately Ontario and Quebec.) issued the stamps of Queen Victoria. For the stamp image, the Queen's portrait by Alfred Edward Chalon (1780–1860) was used. This design is called the Chalon head. The stamps were printed in New York.

In fine and unused condition, these stamps are extremely costly. In 2023, a 12d black sold for $292,500 CAD and, in 2024, a mint pair sold for $625,000 CAD.

The first series of stamps for the colony of Canada was issued in 1851 and comprised three pence, six pence, and 12 pence values. One shilling was not used as the face value because in local currency, it had more than one meaning of value. In New England, one shilling meant 16 and two-thirds cents, which was equal to 10 pence. In New York, one shilling meant 12 and a half cents, equalling seven pence halfpenny. Therefore 12 pence offered no misunderstanding as to its value. Out of 51,000 of the 12 pence black that were printed, only 1,450 stamps were sold in the three and half years they were offered. About 130 copies are believed to be still in existence. There are only five unused pairs and two used pairs.

== See also ==
- Canada 2c Large Queen on laid paper
- List of postage stamps
- Penny Black
- Penny Lilac
- Penny Red
- Postage stamps and postal history of Canada
- Two Penny Blue
