= Pagsanjan Falls stamp =

American territorial postage stamp with design error

Pagsanjan Falls
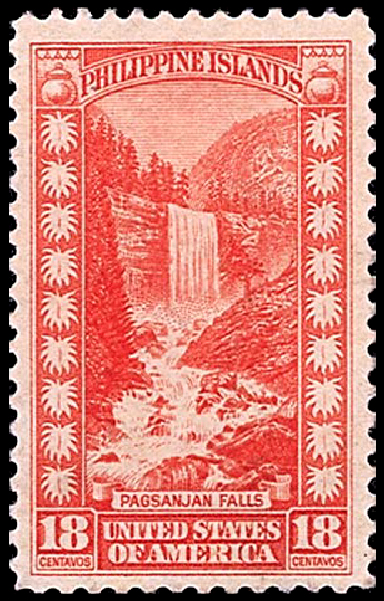
- Pagsanjan Falls stamp depicting Vernal Fall in Yosemite National Park
- Country of production: United States
- Date of production: May 3, 1932
- Printer: Bureau of Engraving and Printing
- Nature of rarity: Postage stamp design error
- Face value: 18 cents
- Estimated value: US$26.00 (mint) (2008)

The Pagsanjan Falls stamp is a Philippine stamp, issued on May 3, 1932, which is notable for having a design error. It is part of a set of seven stamps showing places of interest and landmarks in the Philippines, at that time a United States territory. It was printed in the United States and intended to display an image of Pagsanjan Falls, a tourist attraction in Laguna province in the Philippines. However, the image on the stamp is actually of Vernal Fall in Yosemite National Park, California. The stamp was withdrawn on November 17, 1932.

The error has made the stamp the most sought after in the set: the 2008 Scott catalog value for a very fine mint never-hinged copy of the stamp (Scott #357) is US$25.00, while no other stamp in the set exceeds US$1.00. The rest of the set comprises 2¢ – Mount Mayon, 4¢ – the Manila Central Post Office, 12¢ – Pier No. 7, Manila, 20¢ – planting rice, 24¢ – rice terraces and 32¢ – Baguio zigzag.

== Description ==
The postage stamp design is of an upright rectangular form, a shape chosen so that the waterfall could be displayed in its entirety, and is printed in yellow and orange inks. The textural elements are at the top and bottom of the stamp; the base panel reads "United States of America" with 18 centavos denomination corner box on either side. Above this is a small banner that reads "Pagsanjan Falls" while a panel at the top of the stamp are the words "Philippine Islands" in an arc. The picture illustrates a large waterfall with trees growing at the top and a few boats nearby. The colors are bright so as to render the picture highly visible. Additional design elements frame the image on both sides.

== Error ==
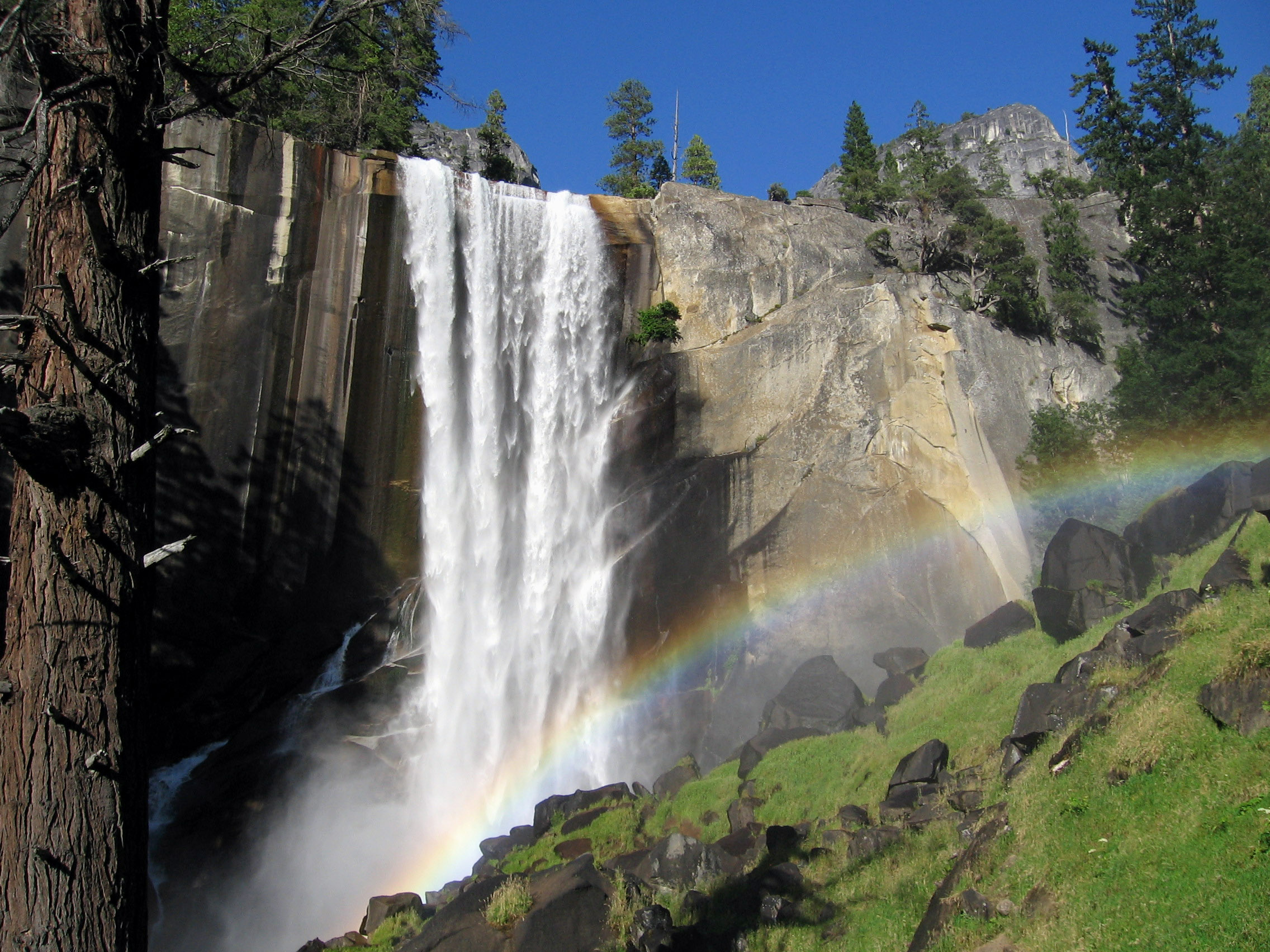
Vernal Fall

Although the inscription reads Pagsanjan Falls, the waterfall on the stamp is Vernal Fall, a waterfall in Yosemite National Park in California. The error came about because the engraver, the Bureau of Engraving and Printing, used a photograph of Vernal Fall as the basis for the image on the stamp because the wrong image had been supplied by the post office in Manila. At the time, July 1941, it was estimated that one and a half million copies had been printed even though a recall was considered. No stamp was issued with a corrected image.

== See also ==
- List of postage stamps
