= Postage stamp design error =

Mistake made during postage stamp design

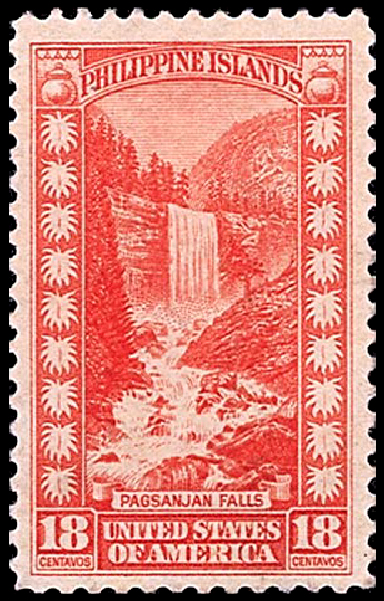
This Philippine stamp of 1932 is captioned Pagsanjan Falls, but actually depicts Vernal Fall

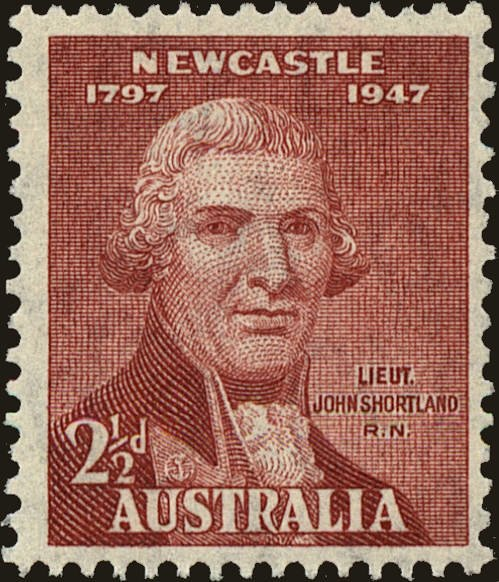
Stamp dedicated to the 150th anniversary of the founding of Newcastle in which the artist depicted his own father instead of the explorer Lt. John Shortland, who discovered the Hunter River (New South Wales).

A postage stamp design error is a mistake made during the design phase of the postage stamp production process. Design errors most commonly occur as minor mistakes, such as a missing letter in the binomial name of an organism depicted on the stamp, but some have been major gaffes, such as a map appearing to lay claim to another country's territory, or the depiction of the wrong person on the stamp.

A design error caught during the production process may disappear quietly, with copies of the error only getting into the public's hands via unscrupulous employees (these are therefore not considered "real" stamps). Design errors are often caught during the distribution process, when large numbers of postal workers are scrutinizing the new stamp; although officials may elect to withdraw all the stamps at that point, it is very difficult to retrieve every one of them, and in these instances a few may end up being sold and used. The exact circumstances are important, because once the stamp is sold to a customer, whether or not against the postal service's rules, it is considered to be legitimate.

The Legends of the West sheet was a particularly difficult case. Shortly before the release of this commemorative series (and after sheets had already been sent to post offices and found their way into collectors' hands), a claim was made that the image of Bill Pickett used for his stamp's painting was actually an image of his brother Ben. The United States Postal Service decided to recall the stamps and re-issue them later with Pickett's stamp based on an image known with certainty to be him. The USPS sold the entire run of erroneous stamps at face value by lottery.

Somewhat rarer is a design error that is first noticed by a member of the public. This usually happens within a few days of the stamp first going on sale, and usually ends up as the subject of newspaper articles. A recent example of this is the Maya Angelou stamp issued by the U.S. Postal Service on April 7, 2015. The stamp contains a quotation that had been frequently attributed to Ms. Angelou, but was really written by Joan Walsh Anglund. In this circumstance, the Postal Service was unaware of the real author until it was brought to their attention by The Washington Post.

The response of postal officials may include withdrawal of all the stamps, or simply the suspension of printing and distribution, pending revision and reprinting. If the stamps are withdrawn, then the ones already in circulation become instant rarities, as happened with the PRC's "All China is Red" stamp of 1968. The withdrawn stamps may be destroyed or overprinted if the design can be repaired that way.

Design errors occurring during chaotic times such as revolutions will simply become a topic of discussion for future philatelists. Similarly, errors occurring in highly technical aspects, such as the spelling of a scientific name of a plant or animal, may not be noticed during the stamp's period of use.

== Some notable design errors ==
- Pagsanjan Falls stamp, Philippines 1932
- Franz Schubert/Robert Schumann error, East Germany 1956
- Gronchi Rosa, Italy 1961
- The Whole Country is Red, China 1968
- Legends of the West, United States 1993
- Queen Elizabeth II error, Malta 2008
- Predator Free 2050, New Zealand 2018.

The largest known run of a postage stamp error was the 2011 "Statue of Liberty Forever stamp" by the United States Postal Service. As many as 10.5 billion incorrect stamps were produced between the design's release in December 2010 and the error identification in March 2011, when the Texas stock photo company Sunipix noted that the design featured the Las Vegas replica of the Statue of Liberty rather than the original Statue of Liberty.

== Postage stamp design error types ==
Design errors are different from any other types of errors including typographical errors, incorrect watermarks, overprints, paper types, perforation, and gums. There are the following types of design errors:

- Errors in the plot
- Incompatible features:
  - errors in chronological compatibility
  - errors in the depiction of natural phenomena
  - errors in the depiction of technological processes
- Invalid features:
  - errors associated with the ownership of territories
  - mistakes in state and religious symbols
  - errors related to personalities
- Errors in inscriptions or overprints (in numbers, names, concepts)
- Typos, clerical, spelling, punctuation mistakes
- Semantic, factual errors

== See also ==
- Errors, freaks, and oddities

== Bibliography ==
- Jean-Pierre Mangin, Guide mondial des timbres erronés. Errors on stamps, ed. Yvert, Amiens; book 1, 1999, ISBN 2-86814-105-6; book 2, 2005. Bilingual books (English and French).
- D.E.G. Irvine and M. Seshold, Errors in Postage Stamp Design Published by National Philatelic Society, 1979, ISBN 0-906291-01-1
- More than 3.000 crazy errors on stamps
