= Revenue stamps of Jamaica =

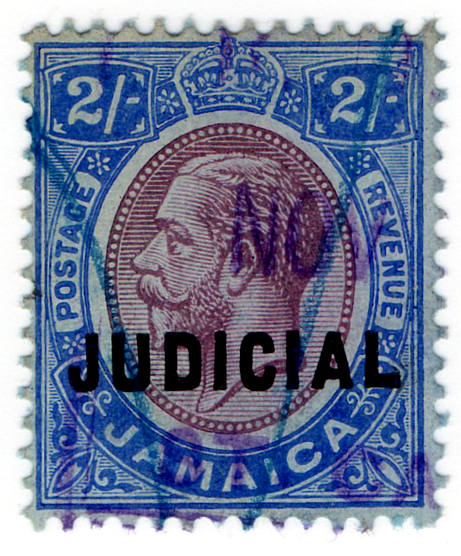
A 2/- Judicial stamp from 1913.

Revenue stamps of Jamaica were first issued in 1855. There were various types of fiscal stamps for different taxes.

== Revenue ==
Jamaica's first revenue stamps were issued in 1855, bearing the colony's coat of arms. The initial set consisted of two imperforate denominations: 1½d and 3d. In 1857 the two values were re-issued with perforations and in 1874 the 3d stamp was issued with a watermark. In 1858, three high values of 1/-, 5/- and 10/- were issued portraying Queen Victoria as well as the coat of arms. In 1865, a new 1d value again portraying the Queen was issued. This exists with three different watermarks.

In 1887, these revenue stamps became valid for postal use. Hence they are regarded as postal fiscals and are listed in SG catalogues.

== Embossed or Impressed stamps ==
Jamaica issued many embossed revenue stamps, which were either printed in large sheets to be used as adhesive revenue stamps, or as directly embossed impressed duty stamps. Adhesive issues were those of the United Kingdom overprinted JAMAICA in black. These exist in various colours, formats and sizes. Adhesive embossed issues were first issued in 1898 and continued to be used until about 1959. Many different die letters are known for these issues.

Directly impressed duty stamps were also used. These were either simply embossed on the document in a colourless die, or later they used a vermilion impressed die. Colourless issues were used from 1804 to 1921, and vermilion ones were used from the 1890s to the 1970s.

== Other adhesive revenues ==
=== Judicial ===
Jamaica issued many stamps for judicial purposes. The first issue consisted of Queen Victoria postage stamps overprinted with a large JUDICIAL in bold sans-serif capitals in 1898. This set was reissued with a different watermark in 1908. Similar issues followed in the following years, with the portrait being changed to that of King George V (1913), King George VI (1938) and Queen Elizabeth II (1953). In some cases, the stamps were from specially printed sheets which were never issued without the overprint. These include all of the stamps bearing the portraits of King George VI or Queen Elizabeth II. In 1969 the Queen Elizabeth II set was reissued denominated in decimal currency, and these remained in use until the 1970s.

=== Coffee Industry Board ===
The Coffee Industry Board of Jamaica was set up in June 1950 to expand the coffee industry. It issued various stamps to pay the levy on roasted or instant coffee from when it was formed until the 1970s.

=== Pensions Authority, National Insurance and Social Security ===
In March 1961, a set of stamps was prepared for the Jamaica Pensions Authority however the order was cancelled prior to printing. In 1965 a set of two values was issued for this purpose, simply inscribed National Insurance without any indication of the country. These were denominated in pre-decimal currency, at 3/- and 4/-, but after the Jamaican dollar was adopted in 1969 they continued to be used as 30c or 40c stamps respectively. Between 1976 and 1981 new stamps similar to the previous design were issued but inscribed Social Security Jamaica. These remained in use for many years, and in the 2000s new values have appeared with elliptical perforations.

== See also ==
- Postage stamps and postal history of Jamaica
