= Sachsendreier =

Sachsendreier can mean the following:

- a postage stamp issued in 1850, see Sachsen 3 Pfennige red
- a formation of three rock bands from Saxony, namely Electra, Stern Meißen, and Lift
