= Postal Union Congress £1 stamp =

British postage stamp

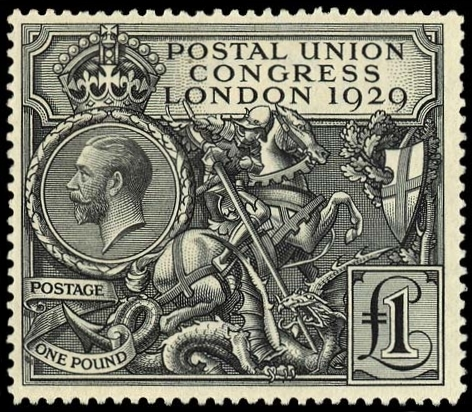
- A mint example.
- Country of production: United Kingdom
- Date of production: 1929
- Designer: Harold Nelson
- Engraver: J.A.C.Harrison
- Printer: Bradbury, Wilkinson & Co
- Commemorates: 1929 Congress of the Universal Postal Union
- Face value: £1

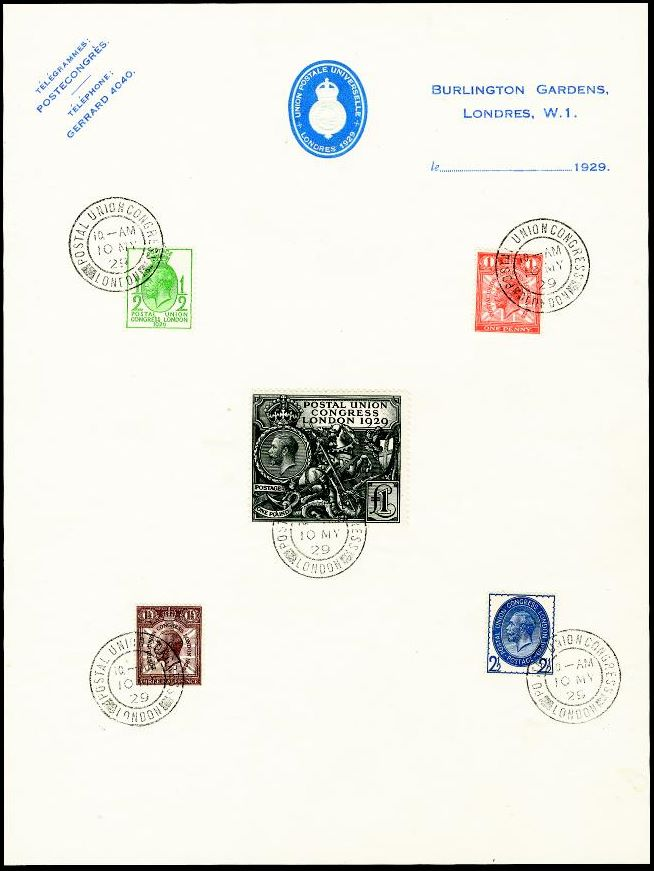
The complete 1929 set cancelled on UPU notepaper.

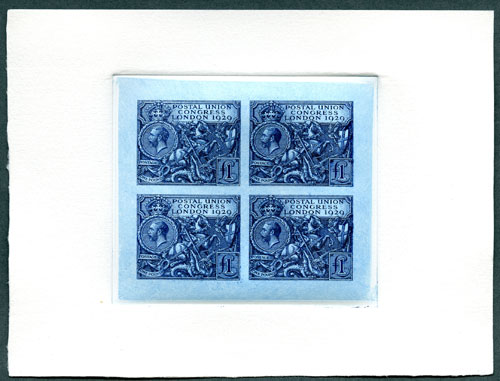
The 2010 imperforate facsimile in blue of the 1929 PUC £1.

The Postal Union Congress (PUC) £1 stamp is one of a series of postage stamps of Great Britain issued in 1929. It is one of the classics of British philately and has been described as one of the most beautiful British stamps ever issued. The stamp was only the second British commemorative stamp to be issued. The first were the British Empire Exhibition postage stamps of 1924–25.

== Design ==
The stamp was designed by Harold Nelson and features the head of King George V and an image of St George and the Dragon which had originally been drawn as an essay for the 1924 British Empire Exhibition stamps. A committee was formed to solicit designs and the chosen design from the 16 submitted was approved by Queen Mary as the King was ill with septicaemia.

== Denomination ==
The stamp was issued along with four other small format stamps to mark the 1929 Postal Union Congress of the Universal Postal Union and was criticised at the time for its high face value.

As the other stamps in the set were low values, it has been speculated that the value of the large stamp may have been set at £1 to produce a more impressive souvenir for the visiting postal delegates to the Congress. Alternatively, others have simply seen it as a cynical attempt to extract as much money as possible from stamp collectors.

Stanley Phillips said in Gibbons Stamp Monthly that the stamp was "Britain’s disgrace". He also said that "...the policy of issuing a set consisting of four low value stamps and then a one pound denomination is absolutely indefensible."

== Technical details ==
The stamp was line engraved and recess printed by Bradbury, Wilkinson & Co. The contract was given to them on condition that the stamp would be engraved by J. A. C. Harrison. He had to be given special permission to do the work as he was under contract to Waterlow and Sons at the time.

The stamp was given a unique design of GVR Royal Cypher watermark and was issued in sheets of 20 (4 horizontally x 5 vertically), and 61,000 stamps were issued. Waterlow and Sons printed the four low values.

== London 2010 International Stamp Exhibition ==
In 2010 the stamp was reproduced for the London 2010 International Stamp Exhibition by Enschede using the original die. The reproductions had a printed design on the back similar to a watermark to help distinguish them from the originals. They also had the word FACSIMILE printed diagonally across the back in a repeating pattern. The stamps were sold in blocks of four in presentation packs with an insert written by Douglas Muir.

In addition, a separate printing in blue was made at an exhibition of old printing techniques at the London Guildhall Art Gallery by Enschede, also in blocks of four. Fifty imperforate blocks were printed on roughly torn paper which were sold to the public.

== See also ==
- List of postage stamps
