= Postage stamps and postal history of Jamaica =

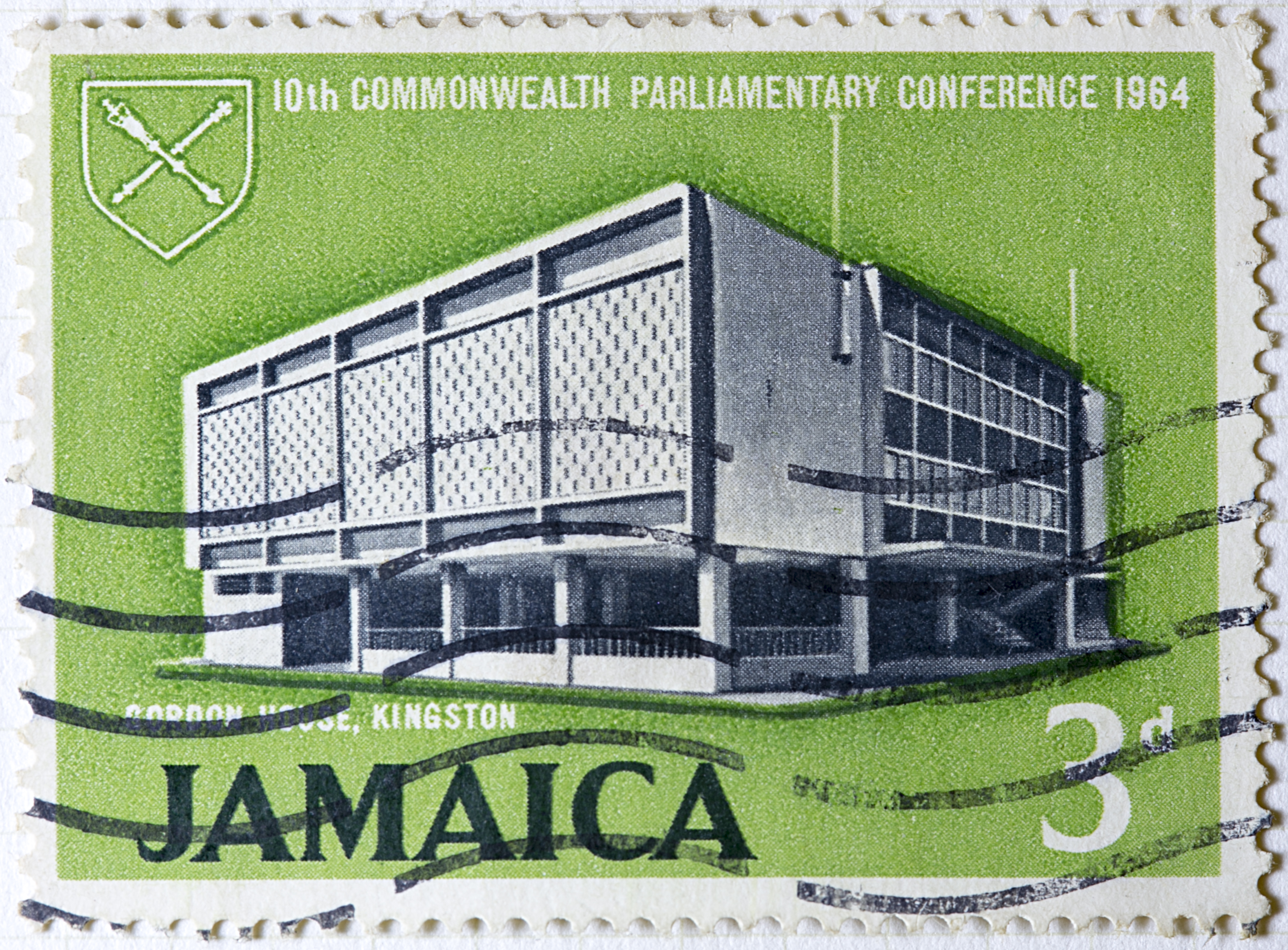
A 1964 stamp of Jamaica

This is a survey of the postage stamps and postal history of Jamaica.

== Early postal service ==
Jamaica was the first British colony to establish a post office. Gabriel Martin was appointed Postmaster General on 31 October 1671, shortly after British possession of the island was confirmed. Martin carried mail via posthorse between St. Jago and Passage Fort for several years, then disappeared from the record. In the 1680s, sea captain James Wale secured the support of the Earl of Rochester to set up a post office (against the wishes of Jamaican governor Molesworth), but the service seems to have been stillborn, and not until 1705 was a statute (9 Anne) created to legally establish a postal service (in several islands of the West Indies) and allow the postmaster to charge a fee for the delivery of mail. Letters were carried by a packet service until 1711, then the postal service lapsed again until re-established by Governor Nicholas Lawes in 1720.

The local planters typically preferred to entrust their letters directly to merchant ship captains, and considered the charging of fees by postmaster Edward Dismore to be tantamount to extortion. Matters came to a head in 1755, when a select committee examined the finances of the postal system, but Dismore continued as postmaster into the 1780s, eventually establishing some two dozen post offices across the island.

== Stamps begin ==
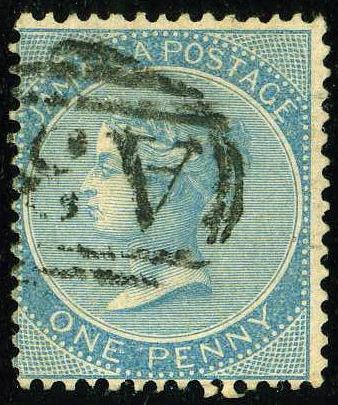
1 Penny blue of the first issue, numeral cancel

British stamps were used from 8 May 1858 in Kingston and from November 1858 at other offices. Until 1860, the postal service under the control of Great Britain, despite repeated efforts by Jamaican authorities to take over. Soon afterwards, British stamps were no longer accepted, and De La Rue was commissioned to produce stamps for Jamaica, featuring a laureate profile of Queen Victoria. The first issue consisted of five values ranging from one penny to one shilling, each with a different frame, inscribed "JAMAICA POSTAGE", and were watermarked with a pineapple design. They were first issued on 23 November 1860. Additional stamps in the series appeared through the end of the century.

In 1863 four letter boxes were placed around Kingston. Inland delivery was increased from twice/week to three times per week in 1868. Mail carriage was originally via mule, then via railroad in the 1860s, then back to roads due to difficulties with the trains, not switching back to railroad until the railways were improved in the late 1870s. Jamaica joined the Universal Postal Union on 1 April 1877.

In 1887, the Legislative Council resolved to use a common stamp design for both postage and revenue purposes, and in 1889 Jamaica issued three key plate stamps inscribed "POSTAGE & REVENUE", with the value tablet in a different color.

== 20th century ==
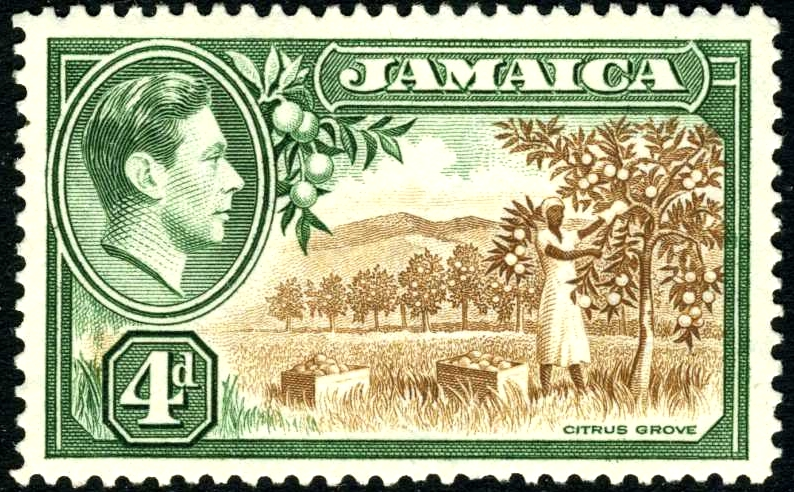
A 1938 4d stamp of Jamaica

In 1900, Jamaica's first pictorial stamp featured a view of Llandovery Falls. Originally intended as a commemorative stamp marking the adoption of Imperial Penny Postage in 1889, it was too long delayed, and is considered a regular stamp. Originally issued in red, it was redesigned and issued in red and black the next year.

For unknown reasons, Jamaica did not adopt a profile of Edward VII upon his accession. Instead, beginning in 1903, new stamps featured the coat of arms of the colony. Following a special petition in 1910, Edward VII was recognized posthumously on a two-pence gray stamp issued 3 February 1911. Stamps depicting George V were more timely, first appearing in 1912.

A pictorial series in 1919 included twelve stamps, ranging from the Jamaica Exhibition of 1891 to various statues and scenery. The series was not commemorative, but was a result of repeated requests by local philatelists to governor Leslie Probyn.

The next definitive series was issued for George VI in 1938, with low values being a profile of the king alone, and the higher values including scenes of various local industries. An issue with new scenes and a full-face portrait of George VI marked the granting of self-government in 1944, although it was not issued until August 1945.

A set of four stamps with historic scenes marked the 300th anniversary of British control in 1955, followed in 1956 by a series of 16 stamps depicting flora, fauna, and local scenery.

== Independence ==
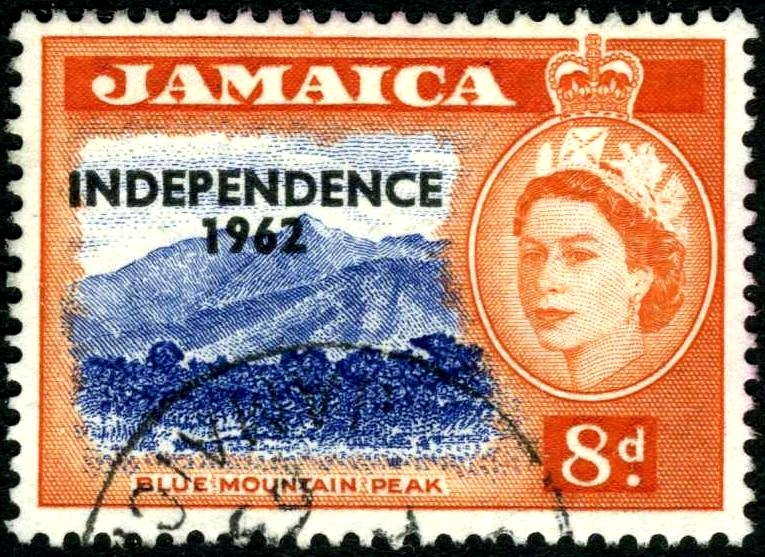
A 1956 stamp of Jamaica overprinted for Independence in 1962

Upon independence in 1962, the 1956 stamps were overprinted "INDEPENDENCE" and "1962". In 1964, a set of three depicted Miss World Carole Joan Crawford; they were soon followed by a new series of 16 with various designs. Only the one-pound value included a portrait of Queen Elizabeth; from independence on, the Queen was rarely included in designs.

== See also ==
- Jamaica 1956–58 £1 chocolate and violet
- Jamaica 1sh inverted-frame error
- Jamaica 6d abolition of slavery
- Jamaica human rights set of three

== Sources ==
- G.W. Collett, W. Buckland Edwards, C.S. Morton, L.C.C. Nicholson, eds., Jamaica: Its Postal History, Postage Stamps, and Postmarks (Stanley Gibbons, 1928, reprinted Postilion Publications)
- Cundall, Frank (1891). Handbook of Jamaica for 1891–1892. London & Jamaica: S.P. Munsson & T. Laurence Roxburgh.
- Stanley Gibbons catalogue
