= Postage stamps and postal history of Trinidad and Tobago =

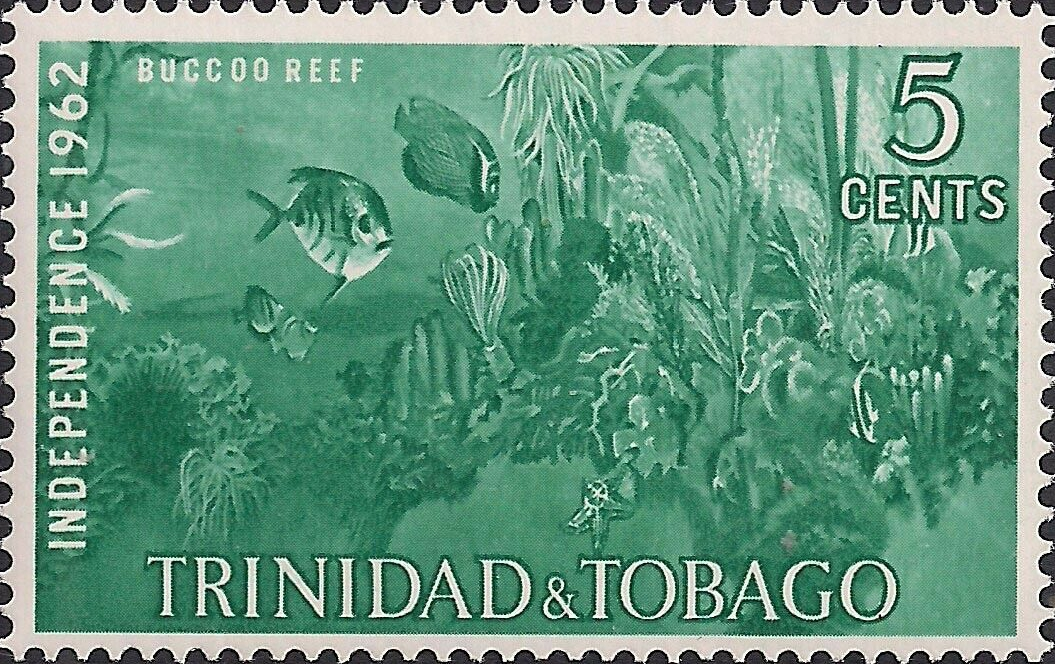

This is a survey of the postage stamps and postal history of Trinidad and Tobago.

Trinidad and Tobago lies northeast of Venezuela and south of Grenada in the Lesser Antilles. Trinidad and Tobago was a Spanish colony from the times of Christopher Columbus to 1802, when it was ceded to Britain. The country obtained independence in 1962.

== Lady McLeod stamps ==
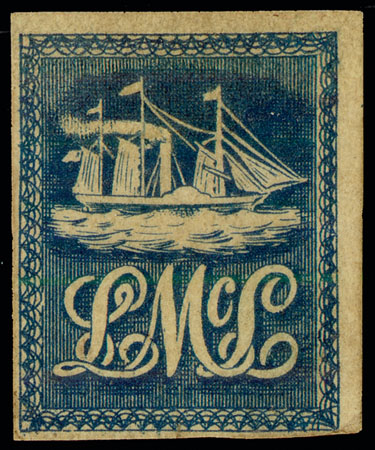
An 1847 Lady McLeod stamp

The first stamps of Trinidad were the famous Lady McLeod, a private local post, stamps of 1847.

== First Trinidad stamps ==
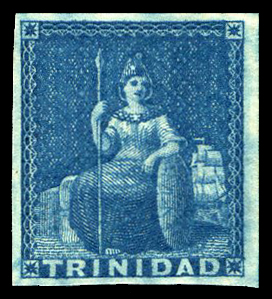
An 1851 key type stamp of Trinidad

The first definitives for Trinidad were issued in 1851.

== Tobago stamps ==
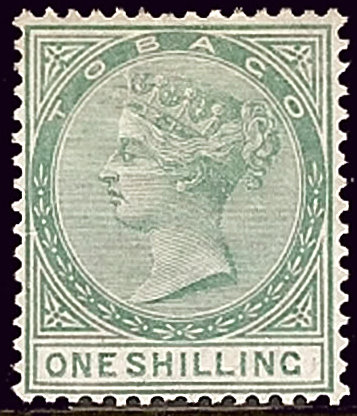
An 1879 stamp of Tobago

Tobago used stamps of Trinidad from 1860. Stamps of Tobago were not issued until 1879. Tobago again used stamps of Trinidad from 1896.

== Trinidad and Tobago issues ==
Stamps inscribed "Trinidad & Tobago" were first issued in 1913 after the integration of the postal administrations of Trinidad and Tobago.

== Independence ==
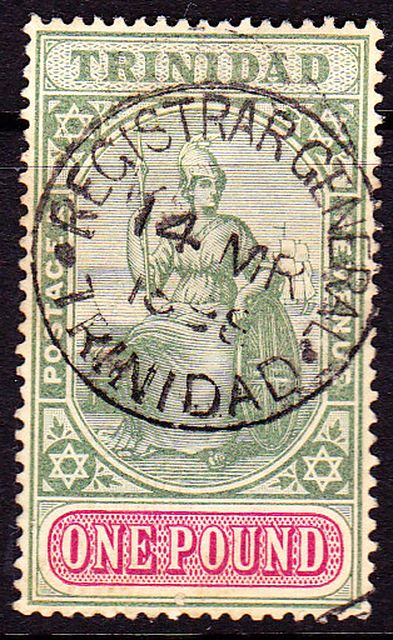
An 1896 Trinidad stamp

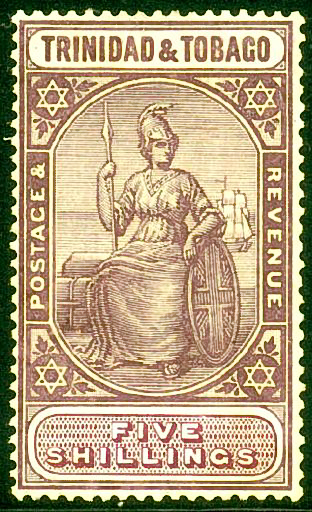
A 1914 five shilling stamp of Trinidad & Tobago

Trinidad and Tobago issued stamps as an independence state on 31 August 1962.

== See also ==
- Revenue stamps of Trinidad and Tobago
