= Dull Rose =

Rare Ceylonese postage stamp

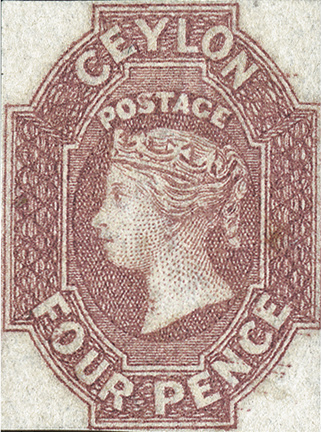
- Country of production: Ceylon
- Date of production: 23 April 1859
- Printer: Perkins, Bacon & Co
- Perforation: No
- Depicts: Queen Victoria
- Notability: Most valuable stamp issued in Sri Lanka
- Face value: 4d
- Estimated value: £70,000–100,000 (mint condition) £4,500 (used)

The Dull Rose is a Ceylonese (modern-day Sri Lanka) postage stamp that is considered to be the rarest and most valuable stamp issued in the country. 7000 stamps were issued on 23 April 1859, bearing a face value of four pence. Three others, the 8 pence (chocolate brown), 1 shilling & 9 pence (green), and 2 shilling & 9 pence were issued on the same date as part of a series. These featured a left-facing depiction of a young Queen Victoria in an octagonal framing.

A mint condition original issue Dull Rose was sold for $71,875 at a Cherrystone Philatelic Auction in January 2008. Very few mint condition stamps (about 10) are known to be in existence, valued at £70,000–100,000, while used ones are valued at about £4,500.

== See also ==
- List of postage stamps
