= Gronchi Rosa =

Italian postage stamp design error

- Country of production: Italy
- Date of production: 3 April 1961
- Nature of rarity: Design error
- No. in existence: unknown
- Face value: L. 205

The Gronchi Rosa is a rare Italian postage stamp design error showing outdated country boundaries between Peru and Ecuador. It was one of the stamps of a 1961 issue for the voyage of president Giovanni Gronchi to three South American countries. Issued on 3 April 1961 but withdrawn the same day after the error was observed. The withdrawn stamp was replaced with a grey version.

The 205 liras rosa was intended for the stopover in Peru. The artist made a mistake with the boundaries between Peru and Ecuador. The rose-colored stamp was quickly replaced by a grey version with corrected boundaries, but some philatelic souvenirs using the Gronchi Rosa already existed. A forgery of this stamp is known to exist.

Legal validity was due to begin on 6 April 1961, the date of the President's departure, but validity was suspended and the stamp was replaced with the "Gronchi grigio".

== Description ==
Corrected borders on replacement in the "Gronchi grigio", the grey version of the stamp.

The stamp, with a face value of 205 lire and a pink colour, shows a map of South America. It is one of a set of three stamps dedicated to the countries visited by Giovanni Gronchi: Argentina (170 lire), Uruguay (185 lire) and Peru (205 lire). The face value of the three stamps corresponded to the airmail rate in force at the time to forward mail in the corresponding three South American states. The set was put on sale at the philatelic counters on Easter Monday, 3 April 1961; this coincidence with a holiday did not create the usual attendance at the post offices, so only 79,625 complete sets of the three stamps were sold until the peremptory order to withdraw the offending stamp, on the evening of the day of issue.

=== The error ===
The Gronchi Rosa error emphasizes the borders of Peru, but shows the borders that existed before the 1941-1942 war with Ecuador. Following this war, Peru annexed a vast territory in the Amazon basin, and this acquisition has been illustrated on maps ever since; the error resulted from the use of an old geographical atlas that was mistakenly provided to the draftsman Renato Mura. The conflict between the two Latin American countries broke out while the Second World War was raging in Europe, so went completely unnoticed by most people, in particular when the 1939 edition of the De Agostini atlas was used as the source of the border mistake, showing the geographical and political situation prior to the Ecuadorian–Peruvian War.

== The withdrawal ==
Preparations for the imminent trip of the President of the Italian Republic Giovanni Gronchi to South America were in full swing when, on 3 April 1961, the philatelic series commemorating the event was put on sale. Each stamp in the set depicted, on the right hand side, the map of Europe with Italy in highlighted colour, and, on the left hand side, the American continent with the South American country to which the face value referred, in a darker colour. The ideal link between the two continents was the presidential aeroplane with its nose pointing towards the American continent. In short, it was almost impossible for those who knew the more recent geography not to notice the glaring error.

On the morning of the Easter Monday, the Peruvian Ambassador to Italy, Alfonso Arias, had obtained a full set of the three commemorative stamps. The design provoked immediate protests from the Peruvian Ambassador because the incorrect borders excluded the part of the Amazon that now belonged to Peru, although this annexation was contested by Ecuador. Distribution was immediately suspended after 79,625 copies of the stamp were sold.

On the morning of Tuesday, 4 April, the Ministry of Posts and Telecommunications issued a peremptory order to withdraw the controversial stamps from sale, to return the unsold stamps to the Istituto Poligrafico for destruction, and to replace the stamped sheets with a new corrected version that would be delivered for sale the following day, Wednesday, 5 April. The new stamp would be valid as well, as the entire stamp set would be declared postally valid on Thursday, 6 April, when the state trip would start. The stamps were to be postmarked for the aerogrammes carried on the presidential plane, and their sale was allowed three days in advance in order to allow simple citizen and collectors to prepare their own aerogram in time and send it to Rome, where it would be cancelled with the commemorative postmark and then loaded onto the presidential plane.

The Italian Post tried to eliminate the stamps, even those already sold. They ordered to cover the specimens already franked and sent with a corrected version (in grey colour), intercepting the mail in a great lightning operation. However, some specimens escaped the operation, thus becoming the most sought-after piece by Italian philatelic collectors. There are conflicting opinions on how many of these stamps are in circulation among dealers and collectors. An official press release of the Italian Post in 1966 mentions 79,625 specimens that escaped the recall, 90 of which are kept for postal museums and 80 as gifts to diplomats.

== See also ==
- List of notable postage stamps
- Postage stamps and postal history of Italy
