= Vincent Graves Greene Philatelic Research Foundation =

Canadian nonprofit philatelic library

The Vincent Graves Greene Philatelic Research Foundation is a nonprofit philatelic library, publisher and expertisation service based in Ontario, Canada. The Foundation is incorporated and registered as a charitable organization for Canadian tax purposes and is an active publisher of works relating to Canadian philately.

== History ==
The Foundation was formed in 1975 through a series of gifts from renowned Canadian philatelist, Vincent Graves Greene.

== Governance ==
The Foundation is overseen by a Board of Directors. Since 2006 the Honorary Chairman of the Board has been the philatelist Kenneth Rowe. David McLaughlin was appointed president on November 13, 2023.

== Publications ==
The Foundation is an active publisher of works relating to Canadian philately.

== Expertisation ==
The Foundation provides an expertisation service for philatelic items from British North America and since 1976 has issued over 18500 expert opinions. The Foundation is a member of the Association of International Philatelic Experts (AIEP).

== Library ==
The Foundation library is named The Harry Sutherland Philatelic Library. Natalie Mitchell was appointed the library's manager, effective November 1, 2023.
