= Jean-Pierre Mangin =

French philatelist

Jean-Pierre Mangin (born 26 October 1937) is a French philatelist who specialized in finding error in the design of postage stamps. He wrote a bilingual world guide of Errors on stamps.

Mangin was a member of the French Académie de philatélie between 4 June 1994 and his voted eviction in December 2005. He was president of the European Academy of Philately for a 2000-2007 mandate, but resigned and was evicted there as well. The same happened at the Réal Academia Hispanica de Philatelia.

On 26 October 2007, he became a founding member of the Académie Mondiale de Philatélie, and became its first president.

In the 2000s, he wrote a monthly column in the French magazine L'Écho de la timbrologie about errors on stamps found by the readers.

== Books ==
- With René Geslin, Le Cycle et la Poste, 1988. About the importance of bicycle in the mail distribution in France and stamps of this thematic collection.
- Mangin, Jean-Pierre; Mangin, Marie-Alyette (1999). Timbres erronés [Stamp errors]. Yvert et Tellier. ISBN 978-2-86814-105-7.
