= Stamp program =

Entire process of postage stamp issuance and distribution by the organization

The stamp program of a postal organization is an umbrella term for the entire process of postage stamp issuance and distribution by the organization. Aspects include the decision of about stamps to issue, what postal rates they will pay, postage stamp design, printing, and publicity for the new stamps. The stamp program is generally managed by a specialized department within the organization, which balances demands from the rest of the organization, the nation's government, stamp collectors, and the public which actually buy and use the stamps.

Originally, the choice of stamps to issue was primarily driven by changes to postal rates, and by major changes in the government (for instance, the accession of a new monarch meant that the stamp portrait had to change). Results of research show that the process was often very hasty and reactive, sometimes only a few days or weeks elapsing between the identification of a need and the beginning of printing and distribution.

Through the 20th century, the process became more organized; for instance, it proved possible to sell more commemorative stamps if the public was formally informed of their availability, which inspired first day of issue ceremonies. In turn, simultaneous availability nationwide meant that everything had to be planned out ahead of time. Postal administrations also discovered that collectors were not a bottomless well of money, and that excessive stamp issues would simply go unpurchased, so they decide ahead of time how many stamps are a "reasonable" number.

The upshot is that much of a year's stamp program is known and can be announced in advance. In 2005 for instance, Canada Post announced its 2006 stamps in July 2005, while the United States Postal Service (USPS) announced at the end of November.

The existence of a preannounced program does not preclude last-minute changes; a souvenir sheet commemorating the Mars Pathfinder mission was issued by the USPS December 10, 1997, some five months after the touchdown, while the "United We Stand" stamp in response to the September 11, 2001 attacks came out on October 2, just three weeks later.
