= Jamaica 6d abolition of slavery postage stamp =

Unissued Jamaican postage stamp

Jamaica 6d abolition of slavery
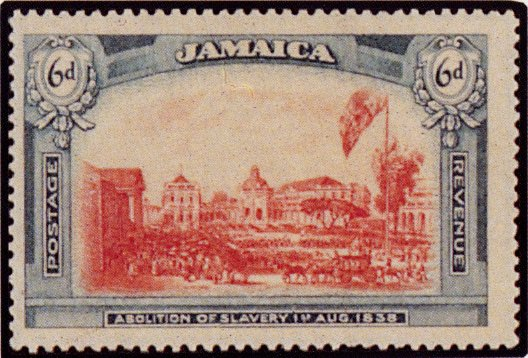
- Country of production: UK
- Location of production: London
- Date of production: 1921
- Nature of rarity: unissued
- No. in existence: 8
- Face value: 6 pence
- Estimated value: £30,000

The Jamaica 6d abolition of slavery postage stamp was prepared for issue in June 1921 but cancelled shortly before issue due to political unrest and the controversial subject matter.

By some estimates, 416,000 stamps were printed and sent to the island in three shipments. The first two consignments arrived in Jamaica around the same time, and were incinerated at the General Penitentiary in Kingston on July 2, 1921. The final consignment, arriving in October, was similarly destroyed. The Crown Agents were then instructed to destroy the 7220 stamps held in their possession along with about 740 stamps distributed via the Universal Postal Union. Two blocks of four were preserved; one block was given to King George V for his collection, while the other became part of the official collection held at the General Post Office in Kingston. This block mysteriously disappeared from the Post Office's vaults and reappeared sometime later as four singles.

As the stamp was so close to being issued, specimens were sent to the Universal Postal Union as usual, a number of which survive.

== See also ==
- Postage stamps and postal history of Jamaica
