= Jamaica 1 shilling inverted-frame stamp error =

Jamaican postage stamp with design error

Jamaica 1sh inverted-frame
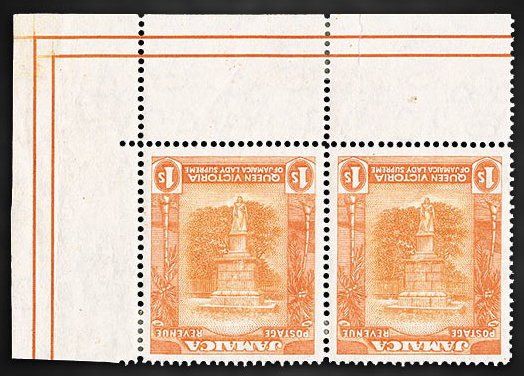
- A corner pair of the stamp.
- Country of production: UK
- Location of production: London
- Date of production: 1920
- Nature of rarity: inverted frame
- No. in existence: 19
- Face value: 1 shilling
- Estimated value: £30,000

The Jamaica 1sh inverted-frame error was discovered in March 1922 at the post office in Manchioneal, a village in the parish of Portland, Jamaica. An entire sheet of 60 stamps on multiple CA paper existed, but only half of this sheet was sent to Manchioneal. The majority of these may have been used for fiscal purposes, because Manchioneal was a banana trading centre and buyers may have used the telegraph office to confirm purchases. The other half of the sheet was possibly sold over the counter in Jamaica's capital, Kingston, because a copy with a Kingston cancellation exists.

Only 5 examples are known in used condition, 4 with a Manchioneal cancel and only 1 with a Kingston cancel.

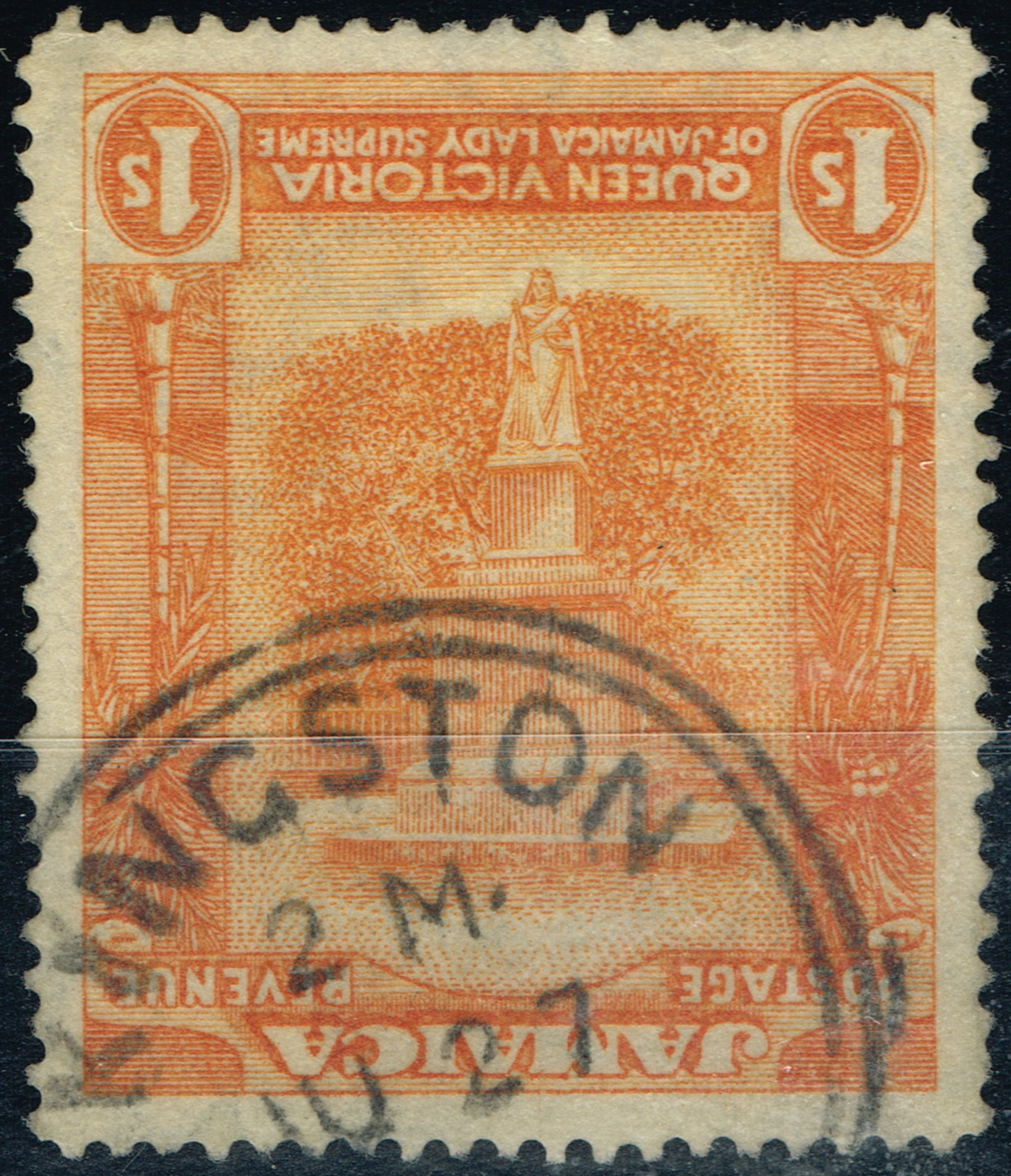
Jamaica 1920 1s Orange-Yellow & Red-Orange SG85a Frame Inverted Stamp No. of Used examples in existence 5 Estimated Value £25,000

== See also ==
- Postage stamps and postal history of Jamaica
