= SinoMaps Press =

Map publisher in China

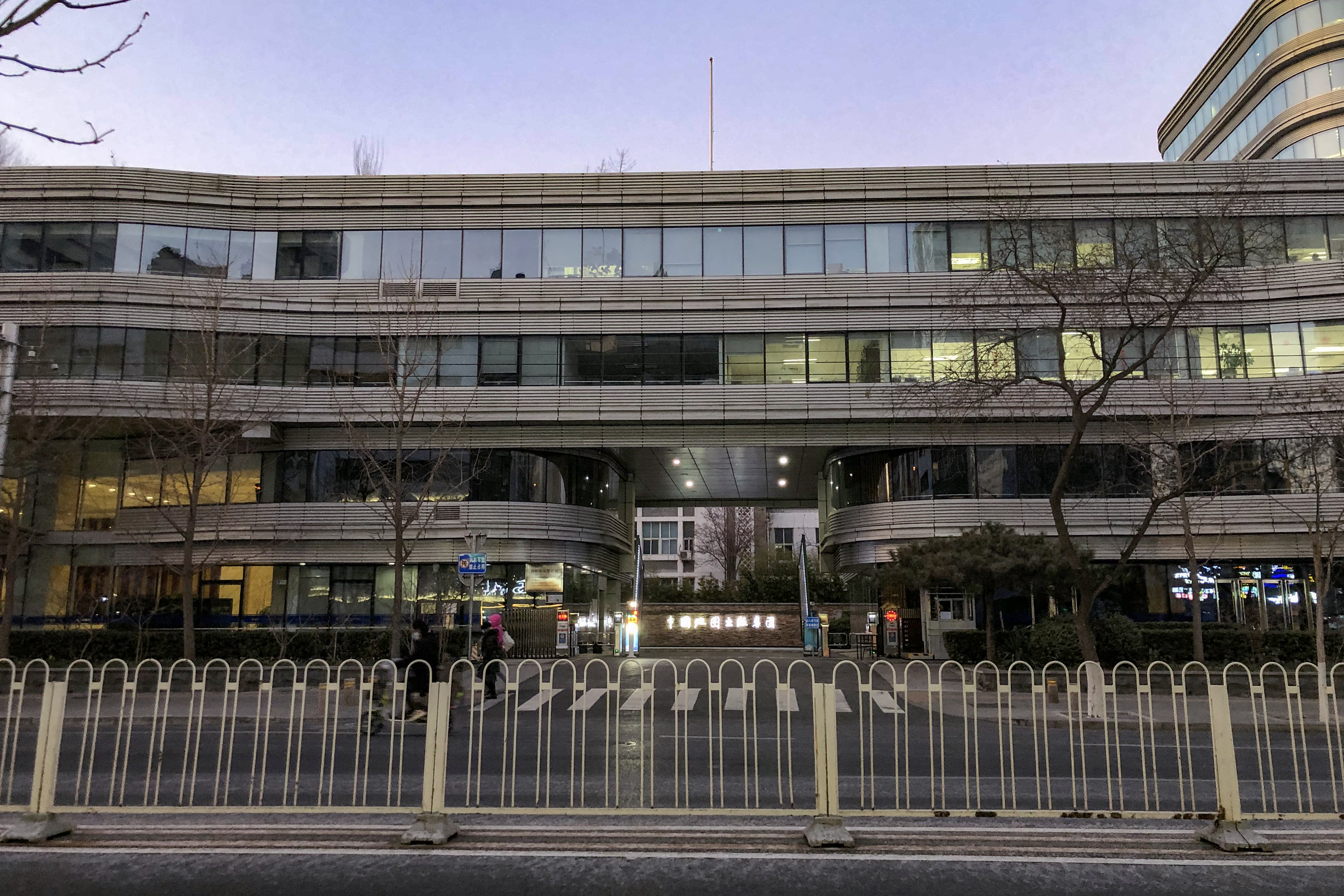
Headquarters in Baizhifang Subdistrict, Beijing

SinoMaps Press (Chinese: 中国地图出版社; pinyin: zhōngguó dìtú chūbǎnshè), previously known as China Cartographic Publishing House, is a publisher in Beijing, China, specializing in professional map publishing.

Established in December 1954, it is the only national-level map publisher in China. In half a century, SinoMaps Press published over 13,600 titles of various maps and atlases, textbooks, academic books and journals in a total of 3.65 billion copies, accounting for 90% of China's total map publications.
