= Fonopost =

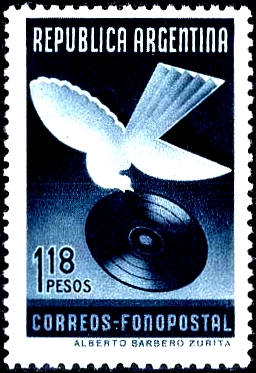
A 1939 Fonopost stamp from Argentina.

Fonopost, or Phonopost, was an experimental postal service in Argentina to record a person's voice and deliver the resulting recording by mail.

The service was demonstrated at the Postal Union Congress in Buenos Aires in 1939 and later the Argentine Post Office issued three stamps to mail the records.

Special mobile recording vans were used to make the recordings which used 8 inch 78 rpm acetate gramophone records.

As a service approved by the Universal Postal Union, Fonopost was not restricted just to Argentina. The Museum voor Communicatie in The Netherlands has a Fonopost unit with recordings that was used in postal offices from 1937 to 1939 mainly to provide people with the opportunity to send spoken messages to relatives in the Dutch East Indies.

The approved status of Fonopost was removed at the Tokyo U.P.U. congress in 1969.

== See also ==
- Correo Argentino
