= Ken Rowe (footballer) =

Australian rules footballer

Personal information
- Full name: Ken Rowe
- Born: 5 December 1943
- Original team: Collegians
- Height: 188 cm (6 ft 2 in)
- Weight: 89 kg (196 lb)

Playing career^{1}
Years	Club	Games (Goals)
1965–66	Melbourne	17 (0)
- ^{1} Playing statistics correct to the end of 1966.

Ken Rowe (born 5 December 1943) is a former Australian rules footballer who played with Melbourne in the Victorian Football League (VFL). On the list in 1964, he had to wait until Round 5, 1965 against Geelong at Kardinia Park to make his league debut. Wearing the number 30, Rowe played 17 games over two VFL seasons. His last game was Round 18, 1966 against Essendon at Windy Hill.

Rowe became player-coach of Shepparton in 1967, leading them to premierships in 1968 and 1969.

Ken Rowe's next football adventure came as captain-coach of Frankston in the Victorian Football Association from 1971 to 1974.

He returned to Melbourne Football Club to serve on the committee between 1978 and 1985, including a recruiting manager in 1983. Ken Rowe became a Life Member in 1985.
