= Kasimir Bileski =

Canadian philatelist

Kasimir Bileski (September 14, 1908 – January 19, 2005) was a Canadian philatelist and stamp dealer based in Winnipeg, Manitoba, Canada. He is best known for his discovery and promotion of the famous "Seaway Inverted" stamps of 1959.

He was also involved in the holding of many of Canada's rare stamps, and wrote widely on philatelic issues.
