= Lady McLeod =

Paddle steamer ship that served as a private local post office

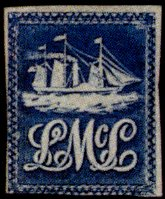
- Country of production: Trinidad
- Location of production: Unknown
- Date of production: April 1847
- Nature of rarity: Few printed
- No. in existence: Unknown
- Face value: None
- Estimated value: On cover CHF39,000

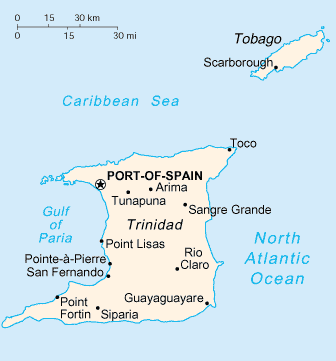
Map of Trinidad: the two towns linked by the Lady McLeod are located on the western part of the island, on the Gulf of Paria.

The Lady McLeod was a paddle steamer and a private local post. The ship sailed regularly between Port of Spain and San Fernando, on Trinidad island, now in Trinidad and Tobago from the end of 1845 until 1854. The private local post ran during the same time with the use of postage stamps on its mail from April 1847.

== History ==
Coming from the Napier shipyard in Glasgow, the ship was christened in hommage of the Governor Sir Henry McLeod's wife and began its Port of Spain–San Fernando route in November 1845.

The 60-ton, 40 hp, steamer was bought by Turnbull, Stewart & Co. In 1846, David Bryce bought it and let it some years later to a San Fernando consortium.

At the beginning of the 1850s, the postal monopoly ended and American and Netherlands ships entered the competition. After a last purchase, the ship foundered near San Fernando in 1854. The Lady McLeod's bell was retrieved and has been regularly displayed by the Trinidad Philatelic Society.

== Postage stamp ==
The private local post of the Lady McLeod began as soon as its service started in November 1845. There were two rates: a monthly subscription of one dollar, or ten cents per letter.

In April 1847, Bryce decided to introduce stamps that were sold individually for 5 cents, or for 4 cents if bought by the hundred. The Lady McLeod only transported letters bearing stamps, or pre-paid mail of the subscribers. The imperforate stamp's illustration was a white ship on a blue background, with the initials "LM^{c} L" printed underneath. Lithographically printed, the stamp was cancelled by a cross drawn by hand or by ripping up a corner.

In 1851, the British colony issued its own stamps figuring a sitting Britannia.

== See also ==
- Postage stamps and postal history of Trinidad and Tobago

== Bibliography ==
- Courtney, Nicholas (2004). The Queen's Stamps. The Authorised History of the Royal Philatelic Collection. Methuen, ISBN 0-413-77228-4, pages 48–50. The story inspired by a letter dated 2 June 1847, with a non cancelled Lady McLeod stamp, that the Duke of York, later King George V, acquired around the 1890s.
- Mackay, James. "Her ladyship's ship". Stamp Magazine #73-10: October 2007, page 59.
