= Lost Continental =

United States postage stamp

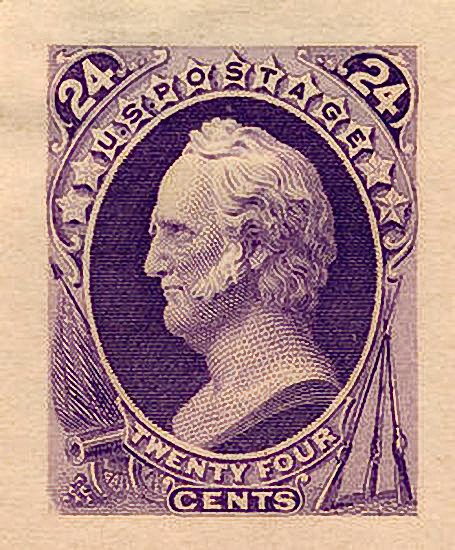
- Die proof of design used to produce the stamp
- Country of production: United States
- Date of production: ca. 1873
- Depicts: Winfield Scott
- Nature of rarity: Unique copy proved to have been printed by the Continental Banknote Company
- No. in existence: 1 known
- Face value: 24 US¢
- Estimated value: US $325,000

The Lost Continental is a light-purple 24¢ United States postage stamp depicting General Winfield Scott, printed around 1873 on vertically ribbed paper by the Continental Banknote Company. It is the only known copy of this 24¢ Scott stamp—among the many surviving examples—that can be positively identified as a printing by the Continental firm, and not by the National Banknote Company, which had originally produced this 24¢ issue three years earlier. For more than a century, experts could not determine with certainty whether Continental had ever, in fact, printed its own version of this stamp—or, if it had done so, whether any of the copies it printed survived. Conclusive evidence did not begin to emerge until a collector named Eraldo Magazzu discovered the Lost Continental while examining a lot of old stamps he had purchased in 1967. Much debate and analysis followed before the stamp, on the evidence of its paper-type, was finally certified as authentic by the Philatelic Foundation in 1992. How many other copies of this Scott issue (if any) printed on normal paper by Continental still exist is a question that philatelists believe will never be answered. Despite this uncertainty about the stamp's actual degree of rarity, the Lost Continental sold for $325,000 at a Siegel Gallery auction in December, 2004 A photograph of the stamp appeared on the front cover of the catalogue for that auction; on page 60 of the catalogue, a photograph of the Lost Continental's back shows the pencil mark "153", a Scott catalogue number that erroneously identifies the stamp as an example printed by the National Banknote Company.

== History ==
In 1873, the National Banknote Company, which had been producing U. S. postage stamps since 1861, lost out to the Continental Banknote Company in the bidding for the new contract to produce U. S. postage stamps for the next four years. Accordingly, Continental took over the production and distribution of National's existing 1870 definitive stamp series, which included the 24¢ Winfield Scott issue. National turned over the printing plates and dies for all twelve stamps in the issue, and later sold Continental its stocks of finished stamps not yet sent to the U. S. Post Office.

For the values between 1¢ and 15¢, Continental made new printing plates produced from dies it had slightly altered by adding small "secret marks" to them. By contrast, Continental deemed it unnecessary to alter the designs of the 24¢, 30¢ and 90¢ denominations, opting to use the old National plates to print these seldom-used stamps in the small quantities that might be needed. As a result, the Continental and National issues of these three values cannot be differentiated by any details of the stamp designs; it is only through examination of ink, perforation characteristics and paper type that the two companies' products can be distinguished from each other. One piece of conclusive evidence is the occasional use of ribbed paper for a stamp, which definitively establishes it as a Continental product, as this paper was never used by National.

Early experts soon found paper or ink characteristics that could clearly identify a 30¢ or 90¢ stamp as either a National or a Continental. For the 24¢ issue, however (the ribbed-paper copy then being unknown), no clear criteria emerged—partly, perhaps, because the purple inks used by both National and Continental were exceptionally susceptible to fading and unpredictable discolorations, resulting in a bewilderingly wide variety of shades.

The suspicion grew that specific differences could not be found because they did not exist: that all surviving examples were, after all, Nationals; that remaining stocks of these had been so large that Continental could merely send them to the Post Office as needed, and never needed to produce—or, at least release—its own version at all. The denomination was seldom used, and, in fact, the Post Office discontinued it in 1875, distributing no copies to local post offices after June 30 of that year. (Note: The United States Post office did not again offer a 24¢ stamp until 1918, when it produced the first airmail issue—which also survives in a rare and valuable variant: the famous Inverted Jenny.) Finally, scholars believed (inaccurately) that the total of remaindered 24¢ stamps eventually destroyed by the Post Office virtually equaled the total that had been delivered to it by Continental. "It is quite possible", wrote Lester Brookman, "that this stamp should be dismissed with the remark made by the old farmer when he first saw a giraffe, which was 'There ain't no such animal.'" Eventually, the Scott Catalogue deleted its entry for the Continental 24¢ issue (as #164), not to restore it until the ribbed-paper copy received certification.

The slim evidence of the 24¢ Continental's existence provided by the ribbed-paper copy was substantially bolstered in 2000, when William E. Mooz published further proof that Continental indeed printed its own version of the issue. In September 1873, the company had 120,700 of the 24¢ Scott stamps in its inventory, and these could have only been copies that the firm printed itself, because it had not yet received any stamps from National (documents prove that 24¢ stamps from National did not arrive at Continental until a month later). Mooz believes that in subsequent deliveries of 24¢ sheets to the Post Office, Continental intermixed its own printings with sheets it had inherited from its predecessor. During the years of National's contract, the Post Office issued some 1,145,000 24¢ stamps. About ten years after the denomination was discontinued, 364,950 copies were destroyed. It is unknown whether these included any remaining from the original National stocks.

As a result, the "Lost Continental" must be classified not as a unique surviving copy of an issue, but a unique surviving variant of an issue—an issue that may still exist in 100,000 or more normal-paper examples—which would make it rare, but not inordinately so. By ironic contrast, only about 2,000 copies were produced of the earliest National Banknote version of the 24¢ Scott stamp—the issue incised with the H grill (Scott #142). A grilled example of this extremely scarce stamp, postally used, is valued in the Scott catalogue at $7,500; no unused example with grill has ever been found.
