= Statue of Liberty Forever stamp =

American postage stamp with design error

- Country of production: USA
- Date of production: December 1, 2010
- Commemorates: Statue of Liberty (New York City)
- Depicts: Statue of Liberty (Las Vegas)
- Notability: Uses image of replica, not original, statue
- No. in existence: 10.5 billion
- Estimated value: Negligible

The Statue of Liberty Forever stamp is a postage stamp issued by United States Post Office on December 1, 2010. It gained notoriety for mistakenly depicting the replica Statue of Liberty (Liberty Enlightening the World) located at the New York-New York Hotel and Casino on the Las Vegas Strip rather than the original Statue of Liberty in New York. The error was identified by Texas-based stock photo agency Sunipix in March 2011. Ten and a half billion of the error stamps were produced. The mistake is the largest run of an error on a postage stamp.

In 2013, sculptor Robert S. Davidson sued the Postal Service for copyright infringement, and in July 2018 a judge ordered the United States Postal Service to pay Davidson $3.5 million.
