= Llandovery Falls =

Waterfall in Jamaica

Coordinates: 18.3906272°N 77.121179°W

Llandovery Falls, also known as the Konoko Falls, is a small waterfall located in Saint Ann Parish, Jamaica. The falls were named after a nearby sugar estate. The falls became well known after a photograph of them taken by James Johnston was used on the first one-penny stamp in Jamaica. In the early 20th century the falls were described on a tourist postcard as "A never-failing source of fresh water containing a fair amount of fish".
