= The Whole Country Is Red =

Rare Chinese postage stamp

The Whole Country is Red
- Country of production: People's Republic of China
- Date of production: 1968
- Designer: Wang Weisheng
- Printer: China Cartographic Publishing House
- Face value: 8 fen

The Whole Country Is Red
- Traditional Chinese: 全國山河一片紅
- Simplified Chinese: 全国山河一片红
- Literal meaning: the whole country's mountains and rivers are one red piece
Transcriptions
Standard Mandarin
- Hanyu Pinyin: quánguó shānhé yīpiàn hóng

The Whole Country is Red is a Chinese postage stamp, issued on 24 November 1968, which contained a problem with the design. The stamp features a map of China with the words "The Whole Country is Red" (Chinese: 全国山河一片红), with a worker, farmer, and soldier standing below with copies of Quotations from Chairman Mao, but Taiwan is not shaded red, merely outlined. The face value of the stamp is 8 fen.

Taiwan was not shaded red as at the time of printing, it was (and remains so as of 2026) under the control of the Republic of China instead of the People's Republic of China. The official reason given for the withdrawal of the stamp was that the Spratly and Paracel Islands were missing from the map, as well as the borders with Mongolia, Bhutan, and Myanmar being incorrectly drawn. The stamp had been distributed for less than half a day when an editor at China Cartographic Publishing House noticed the problem with Taiwan and reported it to the Ministry of Posts and Telecommunications. As a result, all Chinese post offices had to stop selling the stamp and return all copies, with only a small quantity making it to private collectors. The designer of the stamp, Wan Weisheng, said in an AFP interview, "For a long time I was really worried that I would be jailed".

The stamp is today regarded as rare, with one being sold at an auction in 2009 for HK$3.68 million (US$475,000, £290,000). More recent auction realisations have varied, at £31050 in December 2010 (Stanley Gibbons), HK$747,500 (£60,300) at InterAsia's September 2011 sale, US$57,000 in 2014 in Germany, US$445,000 in 2014 in Hong Kong.

== See also ==
- List of most expensive philatelic items
