= Sachsen 3 Pfennige red =

Sachsendreier
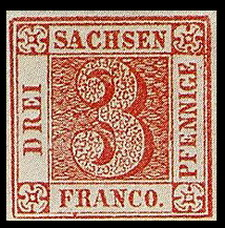
- Country of production: Kingdom of Saxony
- Location of production: Leipzig
- Date of production: 1850
- Designer: Scheele
- Printer: Druckerei J. B. Hirschfeld
- Depicts: numeral
- Notability: first postage stamp of Saxony
- No. in existence: 3000 – 4000
- Face value: 3 Pfennige
- Estimated value: $30,000 (for one stamp), $220,000 (for a block)

The Sachsen 3 Pfennige red, commonly called Sachsendreier, issued on 29 June 1850 and valid from 1 July 1850 until 31 December 1867, was the first postage stamp of the Kingdom of Saxony, making Saxony the second among the German States (after the Kingdom of Bavaria) to issue postage stamps.

The beginning of the stamp's postal validity coincides with the inauguration of the Austro-German Postal Union, which had the aim of simplifying the hitherto diverse postal system in Germany, including the payment of postage and the settlement of postal fees between the members of the union. Postage stamps had by then already proven convenient in other countries.

With its value of 3 Pfennige ( = 3/10 Neugroschen = 1/100 Thaler), the Sachsendreier was meant to frank printed matters, such as newspapers in wrappers. Senders often attached the stamp in such a way that half of it stuck to the wrapper, and half to its contents, such that the wrappers could not slide off. Consequently, most stamps of this issue were destroyed, and only less than 1% of the original number has been preserved.

The Sachsendreier was printed in typography on sheets of five by four stamps. Altogether, 500,000 stamps in 25,000 sheets were printed in eight different printings, which can be distinguished by the colour of the printing ink, which varies from a pale brick red to carmine. 463,118 stamps of this issue were sold, the remainder was burned.

Only about three or four thousand Sachsendreier stamps have been preserved. Most of them are cancelled by penstroke or postmark, about 10% are unused. One complete sheet has survived, but in a restored state. It had been found stuck to a wall and had been damaged upon removal. It has changed hands several times, most recently in 1994. A second sheet had been broken up in the 1890s. A block of six stamps is the property of Museum für Kommunikation Berlin, the successor of Reichspostmuseum; a block of four stamps from the lower right corner is in private hands.

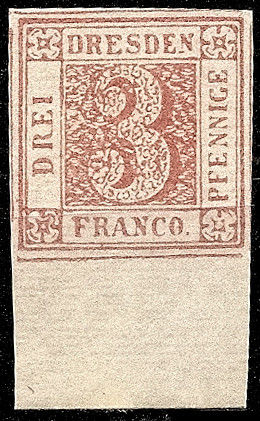
Local stamp inspired by the design of Sachsendreier

Due to its rarity, the stamp has often been forged. Its popularity has made it part of the design of several commemorative stamp issues, and around 1900 the private Dresdner Verkehrs-Anstalt Hansa issued a stamp whose design strongly resembles the Sachsendreier. The price of a stamp is around $30,000 for one stamp to around $220,000 for a block.

== Bibliography ==
- Georg Bühler (1978). Sachsen 3 Pfennig rot.
- Friedrich W. Dieck (1921). Handbuch der Freimarken des Königreichs Sachsen. Leipzig.
- Julius Kaufmann (1960). "Die Sachsen 3 Pfennig". Zwölf berühmte Briefmarken. Tel Aviv. pp. 93–99.
- Arnim Knapp (2010). Der "Sachsen-Dreier" der königlich sächsischen Postverwaltung. Wiesbaden: Heinrich Köhler GmbH & Co. KG.
