= Harold E. H. Nelson =

English artist

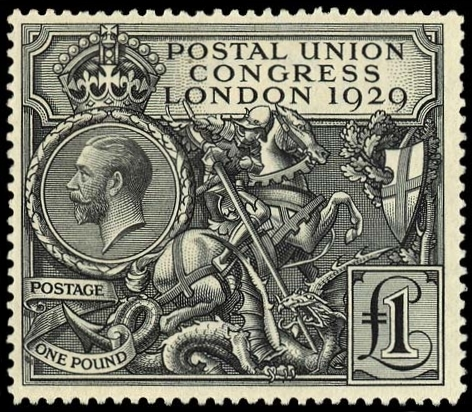
The stamp for the 1929 Postal Union Conference designed by Harold Nelson.

Harold Edward Hughes Nelson (22 May 1871 – 25 February 1948) was an artist, illustrator, designer of bookplates, advertisements and postage stamps, copper etcher and engraver, and lecturer. He signed his works with the initials N. or H.N.

== Life ==
Nelson was born in Dorchester a town where Nelsons had lived since the 18th century, one of four children. (Note: Harold Nelson had two brothers—Mark and Lee William (aka William Lee)—and a sister, Fanny. Harold's nephew, Edmund Nelson, often accompanied him to meetings of the Art Workers Guild—the latter would go on to become an accomplished artist in his own right and a member of the Guild. Harold's brother, William Lee, was a postal worker and eventually became manager of Charing Cross Post Office. He was also a keen photographer and with his friend JW Hughes often photographed places they had visited around England with the extended Nelson family. The photographs of his brother Harold and his wife Margaret portray them as artistic and sensitive individuals.) He studied at both the Lambeth School of Art and the Central School of Arts and Design—at the latter under Luke Taylor. He lived in London for most of his life - mainly in Lambeth and Clapham - then Brockenhurst (in Hampshire), and Carshalton (in SW London) between 1902 and 1906.

Nelson was strongly influenced by Albrecht Dürer and William Morris, and was prolific as a "black and white artist" specialising in medieval illustrations in a Pre-Raphaelite, Arts and Crafts and Art Nouveau style, often with elaborate ornamental borders.

Nelson's provided illustrations for a number of books (see below) and also magazines such as: The Studio, The Graphic (1915), The Sphere, The Queen, Ladies Field, London Illustrated Weekly, Magazine of Art (designed a calendar for 1901), Royal Academy Pictures (illustrated the cover, 1908), Old Colleges of Oxford, Aymer Vallance (illustrated the frontispiece, 1912), The Booklovers Magazine, The Bookplate, Cassells Magazine etc.

He is best known for his bookplates and heraldic designs, the first one appearing in 1897, inspired by Dürer. Commissioned by individuals and institutions, his designs were carefully matched to the name or character of the owner. The Studio, in a review of 1900, wrote of his work, "…bright and spirited, while in beauty of drawing it would be hard to find their equals among modern book-plates."

Although Nelson trained in the traditions of William Morris, as a commercial artist he adapted his style to each new movement as it came along. In the 1920s and 1930s he worked in an Art Deco style, his most notable designs being the Wembley Lion with a 'setting sun' motif on the British Empire postage stamps of 1924 and 1925. However, his drawing of St George and the Dragon for the £1 stamp for the Postal Union Congress, 1929, harks back to his earlier style.

Nelson illustrated several books including one authored by the Queen of Romania: A Real Queen's Fairy Tales under the pseudonym 'Carmen Sylva' (published in 1901). The illustrations were described in The Studio as "clever, powerful and beautiful".

His other commercial activities involved designing advertisements for Cadbury's, Pears Soap, Dewar's and Selfridges etc. He also produced artwork for numerous calendars.

Nelson was the Secretary of the Art Workers Guild for a number of years and several examples of his work and a pencil portrait of Nelson by the artist Ester Borough Johnson (fl. 1896–1940) can still be seen at its headquarters in Queens Square, London. There, Nelson (and his wife Margaret) became friends with Charles Robert Ashbee, the designer, author and entrepreneur who was influential in the English Arts and Crafts movement. After Nelson's death, his wife Margaret took over the duties as secretary of the Guild. Nelson was also a member of the Society of Graphic Art (SGA).

He died suddenly in 1948, aged 77, in Regent Street, London - leaving a widow and a daughter, Winifrede.

== Works ==
Harold Nelson illustrated the following works:

- La Motte Fouque. Undine and Aslauga's Knight (George Newnes Ltd., London, 1901).
- Carmen Sylva. A Real Queen's Fairy Tales (Davis and Company, Chicago, 1901).
- Harold Nelson. Harold Nelson: his book of book-plates consisting of 24 original designs. (Edinburgh, Otto Schulze & Company, 1904).
- Harold Nelson. Reproductions of twenty-five designs for book plates.(Otto Schulze & Co., 1910).
- Harold Nelson. Bookplates by Harold Nelson (B.T. Batsford, Ltd. 1929).
- Harold Nelson. The noble birth and gallant achievements of that remarkable outlaw Robin Hood : together with a true account of the many merry & extravagant exploits he play'd, in twelve several stories, newly collected into one volume by an ingenious antiquvary. (O Schulze & company, 1906).
- Harold Nelson. Three Famous English Romances (Otto Schulz & Co., 1913)
- William J. Thoms. The Gallant Atchievements of Robin Hood; The Famous History of Friar Bacon; The Romance of Robert The Devill (Otto Schulze and Co., 1910).
- William J. Thoms. Early English Prose Romances (Schulze & Co., 1904)
- Wiggin, Kate Douglas & Smith, Nora Archibald (eds). The Talking Beasts : A Book of Fable Wisdom (Doubleday Page & Co., 1911).
- Various, The British Girl's Annual 1917 (Cassell, 1916).
- Various. The Bookplate Magazine - Nos 1, 2, 3 & 5. (The Morland Press, 1919–1920).
- James Guthrie (Editor). The Bookplate. Being no.3 of the Journal of The English Bookplate Society (The Pear Tree Press, 1921).
- Alfred Fowler, (Editor). The Bookplate Annual for 1922 & 1923. (self-published 1922 & 1923).
- White, Gleeson. Modern Bookplates and their Designers. (The Studio, Special Winter Number, 1898–1899)
- Charles Holme (Ed.) Modern Pen Drawings : European and American. (The Studio, London, 1901).
- The Studio Magazine. Vol 39 (pp 349, 351);
