= Kenneth Rowe (philatelist) =

British philatelist

Kenneth Rowe

Kenneth Rowe (22 December 1924 – 5 July 2014) was a British philatelist who in 1995 was invited to sign the Roll of Distinguished Philatelists. He was a specialist in the history of forwarding agents, intermediaries who facilitated the routing of international mail before the development of the modern postal system.

Rowe received the Canada Centennial medal in 1967 and the Queen Elizabeth II Silver Jubilee medal in 1977.

== Selected publications ==
- The postal history and markings of the forwarding agents. (1st edition 1966, supplement 1974, 2nd ed. 1984, 3rd ed. 1996. ISBN 0-917528-12-3)
- The postal history of the Canadian contingents in the Anglo-Boer War. Vincent G. Greene Philatelic Research Foundation, Canada, 1981.
