= Postage stamps and postal history of New Zealand =

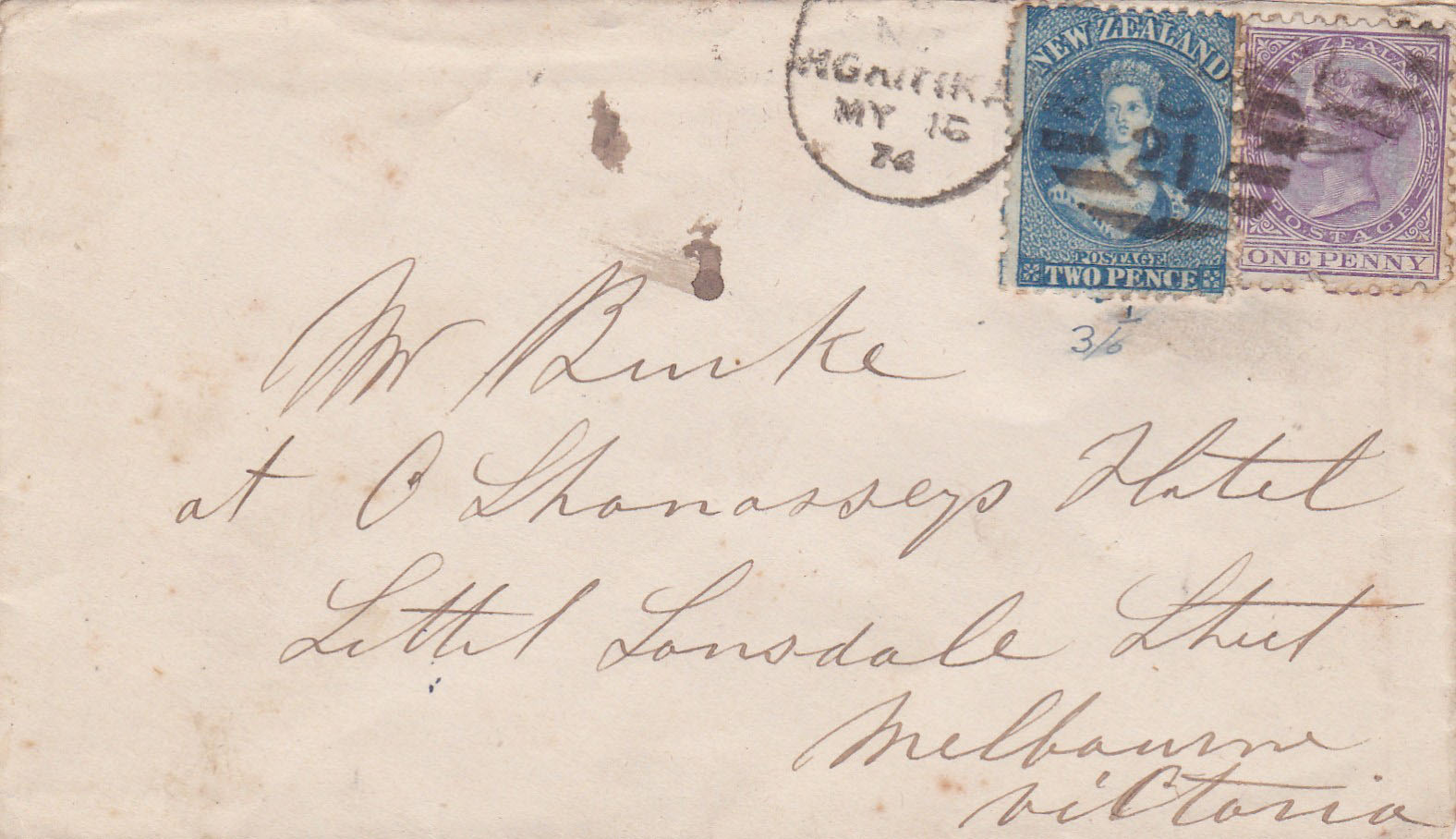
The Chalon design and the 1874 sideface replacement

Postal services in New Zealand have existed since at least 1831, when the Postmaster-General of New South Wales deputed a Bay of Islands merchant to receive and return mail. Governor William Hobson issued an ordinance covering postal matters, although the British government retained control until 1848.

In these initial years, only a small number of post offices were established. Postal services expanded greatly from the mid-1850s, with the Local Posts Act of 1856 allowing provincial governments to establish post offices, and the Post Office Act of 1858, which re-organised postal services under a Postmaster-General.

The New Zealand Post Office continued to operate as a government department until 1987, when postal services were re-organised as New Zealand Post, a state-owned enterprise.

Postage stamps have been issued in New Zealand since around 18 to 20 July 1855 with the "Chalon head" stamps figuring Queen Victoria. The design was based on a full face portrait of the Queen in her state robes at the time of her coronation in 1837, by Alfred Edward Chalon. The stamps were initially hand cut from sheets, but from 1862 on, these sheets started being fed through perforating machines. The Chalon heads were used until 1874 when the lithographed sideface stamps in various designs replaced them.

== History ==
=== Universal one penny postage ===
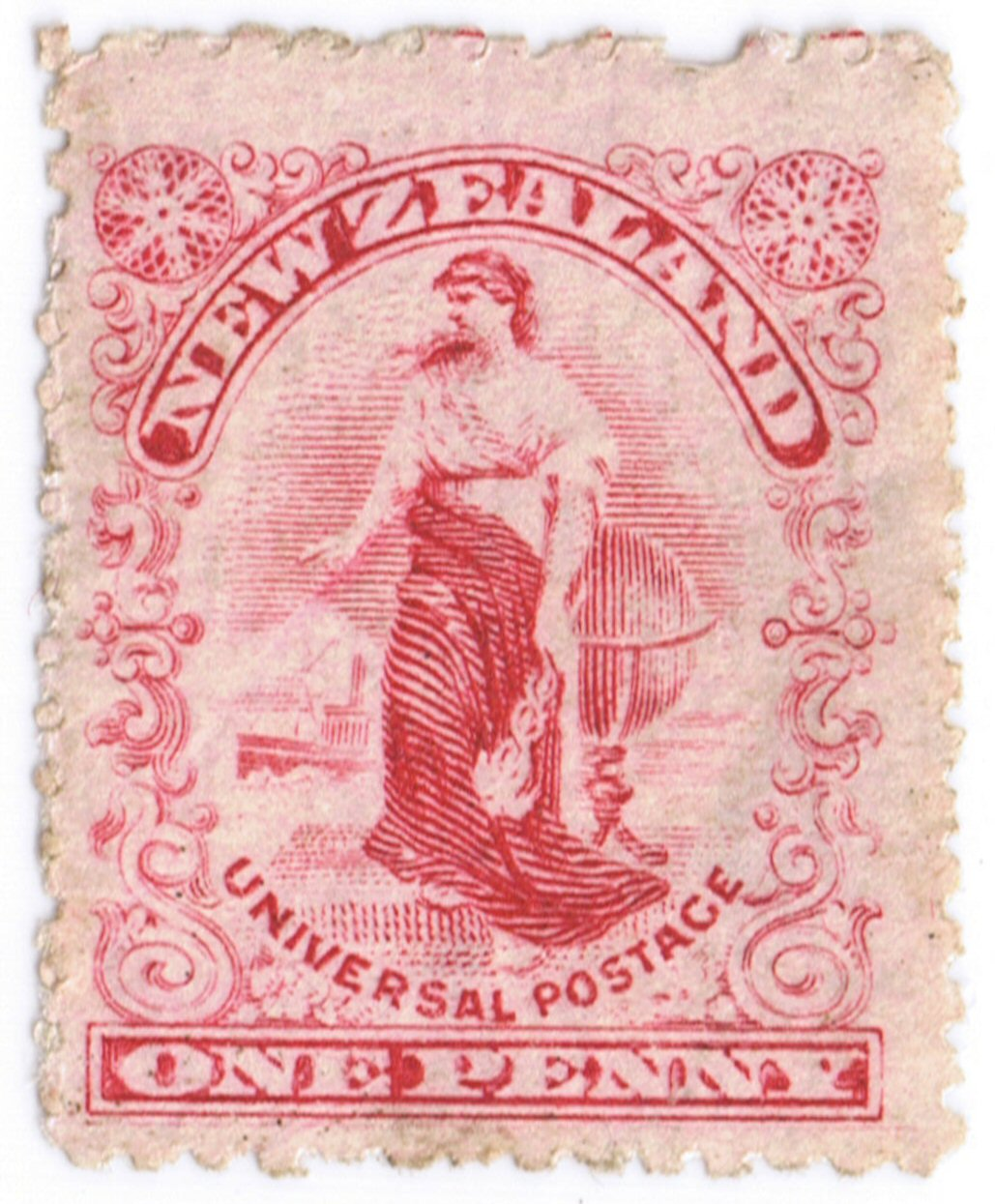
Stamp marking Universal postage, 1901, featuring Zealandia

On 1 January 1901, New Zealand introduced one penny universal postage from New Zealand to any country in the world willing to deliver them. Australia, the United States, France and Germany would not accept such letters, fearful of having to reduce their own postal charges to match. This also halved the cost of mailing letters within New Zealand.

While concern was expressed that Post Office revenues would fall, mail volumes increased sharply and by 1902 any losses had been recovered.

=== First stamp vending machine ===
New Zealand was the first country in the world to prototype and install stamp vending machines; one was installed in the General Post Office, Wellington in 1905.

=== Postal stationery ===
1940 airmail censored first-flight cover from Auckland to Papua

The first items of postal stationery to be issued by New Zealand were postcards on 1 November 1876. The next items of postal stationery to be issued were newspaper wrappers on 1 April 1878. Lettercards were first issued on 1 January 1895, registered envelopes on 21 June 1898, envelopes on 4 June 1899 and air letter sheets or aerogrammes on 17 November 1941.

=== Deregulation ===
The postal system in New Zealand was deregulated on 1 April 1998. There are now a number of privately owned mail companies that have their own delivery systems. They operate in the same manner with paid printed envelopes. A few print their own postage stamps and cancel with an identifier – postmark. Their stamps are made available to collectors. Only the state-owned NZ Post can issue official New Zealand stamps, i.e., stamps with "New Zealand" on them (unless "New Zealand" is part of the operator's name, and the name appears in full). NZ Post still delivers nearly all letters.

Privately owned post companies that issue unofficial stamps, also known as semi-official stamps, for letters they carry include:

- DX Mail
- Fastway Post
- New Zealand Mail
- Whitestone Post
- Pete's Post (part of New Zealand Mail)

=== NFTs ===
In 2023, NZ Post released a collection of NFT stamps, which sold out in 24 hours.

== Individual stamps ==
=== Rare stamps ===
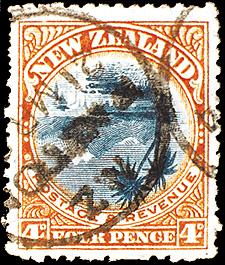
1904 postage stamp with an invert error, featuring Lake Taupō

Arguably, New Zealand's rarest postage stamp is the 1949 HMS Vanguard threepence stamp, intended for issue as part of a set of four stamps (2d, 3d, 5d, and 6d) commemorating a royal visit. When the visit was cancelled, all copies of the stamps were ordered to be destroyed, but a small number—possibly as few as seven—of the 3d value survived. One of these stamps sold at auction in 2017 for NZ$67,850.

Another of the country's rarest stamps is the 1904 Pictorial 4d Lake Taupo invert, an invert error made in 1904. It sold in 1998 for NZ$66,500. There is only one of these in existence.

A third highly valuable New Zealand stamp is the 1906 Christchurch Exhibition 1d claret. While almost all of the penny stamps in this set were printed in bright vermilion red, one sheet was accidentally printed in a dark claret colour. Individual 1d claret stamps have sold at auction for over NZ$20,000.

A rare vertical bisect of the one shilling stamp from the country's first stamp issue, the earliest of the eight known instances of London-printed New Zealand bisects, sold at auction for £21,000 in 2019.

=== Series ===
Since the 1990s a number of series of stamps have portrayed Kiwiana, showing the quirkier and more off-kilter side of New Zealand culture. One such series was the Town Icon set of 1998, including some of the big things in New Zealand such as the Big Lemon & Paeroa bottle, Napier's Pania, the giant carrot of Ohakune, and the shearer statue of Te Kūiti.

Since 2008 an annual series of stamps has been issued to mark the Matariki festival. The second series, issued in 2009, featured contemporary and past images of heitiki. In 2025, the stamps featured an image of the Milky Way taken from the Aoraki Mackenzie International Dark Sky Reserve, as well as the constellations of Matariki, the Southern Cross, and Taurus.

== See also ==
- Health stamp
- List of people on the postage stamps of New Zealand
- Postage stamps and postal history of the Ross Dependency
- Revenue stamps of New Zealand
- Postage stamps and postal history of Australia
