= Postage stamps and postal history of the Pitcairn Islands =

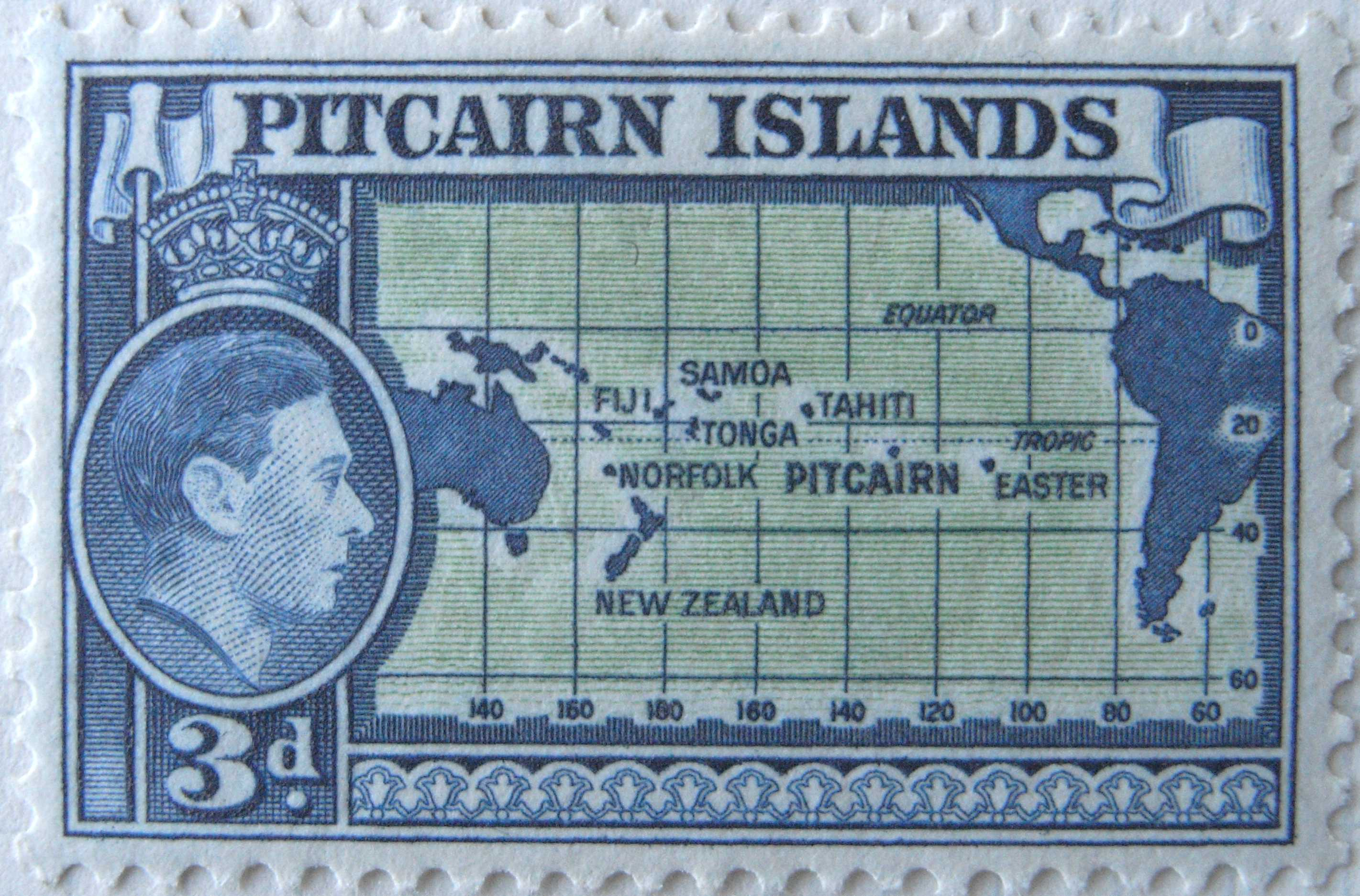
One of the first set of Pitcairn Islands stamps, issued in 1940, showing the location of the territory in the Southern Pacific

The postal history of the Pitcairn Islands began with letters being sent without postage stamps, as none were available on Pitcairn. In 1921, the United Kingdom and New Zealand formally agreed upon a system to handle post from the island, but this arrangement was ended in 1926. In 1927, stamps from New Zealand were introduced. To improve the revenue generation of the colony, the British government established an official post office on the island in 1940. The opening of this post office saw the issuance of the first set of Pitcairn Islands stamps.

Stamps from Pitcairn became popular among stamp collectors, and profits from their sale supported a significant proportion of the colony's budget. Early funds were used to construct a school, and hire a school teacher. At one point, stamp sales made up two-thirds of total government revenue. Despite government reliance on these sales, relatively few stamp designs were produced. Stamps were used to project a certain image of the island overseas, depicting life on the island and the tale of HMS Bounty. Towards the end of the 20th century, a decrease in letter writing and in the popularity of stamp collecting led to a decline in revenue. In 2004, the territory became bankrupt.

== History ==
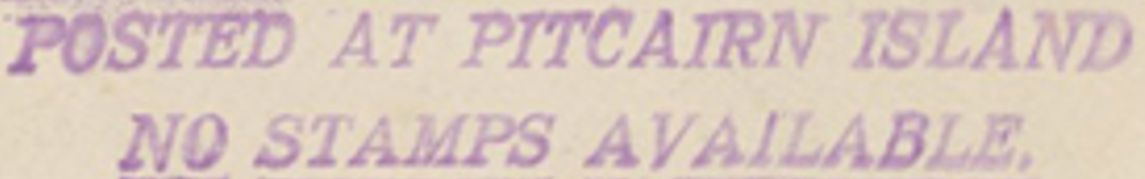
Prior to 1927, letters from Pitcairn were mailed without stamps.

Until the early 20th century, the Pitcairn Islands had no postal system. Outgoing mail was hand stamped with "Posted on Pitcairn Island: no stamps available", and was carried for free by passing ships. These letters received postal stamps and cancellation at various ports of calls, such as San Francisco to the East and New Zealand to the west. Occasional efforts were made to organise mail by the British consulate in nearby Tahiti, and some mail was unofficially handled by a postal office in the Panama Canal Zone following the opening of the canal in 1915. In 1921, the United Kingdom and New Zealand formally agreed to receive post from the island, allowing postal fees to be paid by the letter recipient.

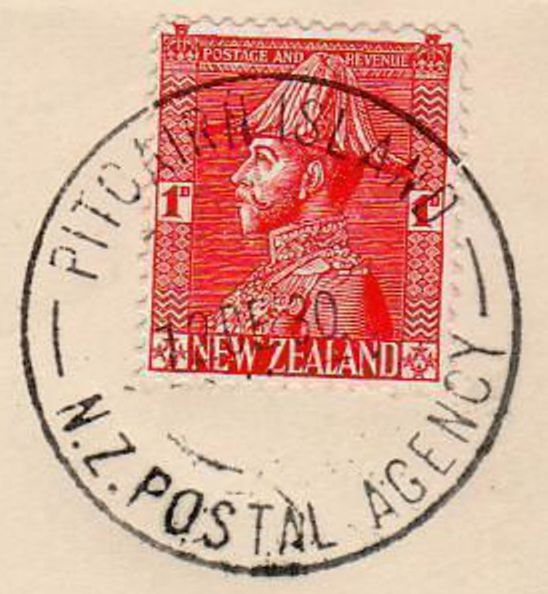
A stamp from New Zealand with a Pitcairn Island cancellation

However, in May 1926, the New Zealand government discontinued this arrangement following reports of ship passengers mixing their own mail into the "no stamp” system set aside for Pitcairn residents, leaving the island again without an official postal service. On 7 June 1927, a postal agency was set up on Pitcairn to sell stamps from New Zealand. Standard rates for New Zealand postage were applied. Post originating from the island was cancelled with the mark "Pitcairn Island/NZ Postal Agency". While New Zealand stamps were used, some commemorative covers were produced, such as one commemorating the establishment of a radio link to the island in 1938.

In 1937, James Scott Neill, then the British Consul in Tonga, visited the island, tasked with examining the island's governance. At the time Britain sought for its colonies to be financially self-sufficient, and Neill suggested that selling postage stamps would be the only way in which Pitcairn could support itself. Following his report, it was announced on 30 April 1940 that an official Post Office would be established on the island. Henry Evans Maude was sent from the Gilbert and Ellice Islands to bring "those twin blessings of civilization, a legal code and...postage stamps."

The New Zealand postal agency ceased operations on 14 October, and the next day the Pitcairn Islands Post Office was opened, along with the release of the first set of Pitcairn postage stamps. These first stamps were delivered by the Fiji Post and Telegraph Department. One first day cover was sent to then-Princess Elizabeth. On the island, first day covers sold out within the day. Envelopes soon ran out, leading to the use of homemade envelopes made first from paper, and later—when paper ran out—from coconut tree materials. The first postmaster was Roy Palmer Clark. In 1941, a new Post Office was built in the central square of Adamstown. The volume of mail sent from the island grew significantly following this. In 1957, Clark called for a bigger post office, which was constructed in the 1960s.

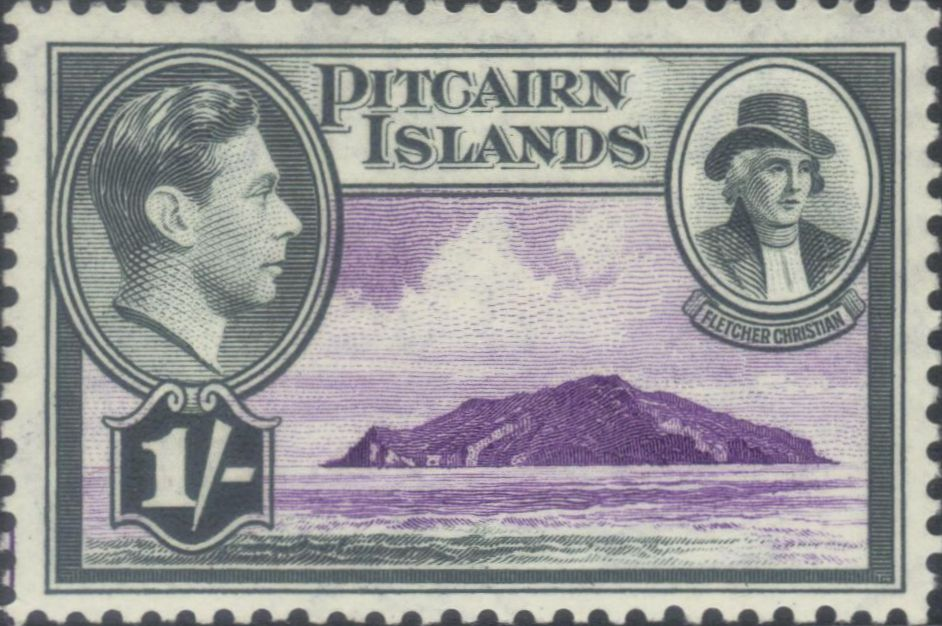
1940 stamp of Pitcairn Islands with view of the island

These stamps became very popular with stamp collectors, and their sale became the dominant source of revenue for the community. In the first six months, £12,760 were sold. Profits went into a general fund which enabled the island to be mostly self-sufficient. This fund was used to meet the regular needs of the community, and pay wages. Funds in excess of regular expenses were used to build a school and hire a teacher from New Zealand, the first professional teacher hired on the island. The fund was also used to subsidise imports and travel to New Zealand. The stamps from the first set were sold until July 1957. By the 1970s, stamp sales contributed two-thirds of the government's revenue. At later points, the sale of coins and .pn domain names also contributed to the fund. Towards the end of the 20th century, as writing letters became less common and stamp collecting declined in popularity, revenue for the fund declined. In 2004, the island went bankrupt, with the British government subsequently providing 90% of its annual budget.

Mail services to and from the island are infrequent. Post is sent via supply ships from New Zealand, which are scheduled a minimum of three times each year. Passing ships sometimes deliver mail to New Zealand on an ad hoc basis.

Until September 2020, the New Zealand-based Pitcairn Islands Philatelic Bureau coordinated the territory's stamp program. On 20 September 2020, the management of the Pitcairn Islands Philatelic Bureau was turned over to Tower Mint, from the United Kingdom.

== Designs ==
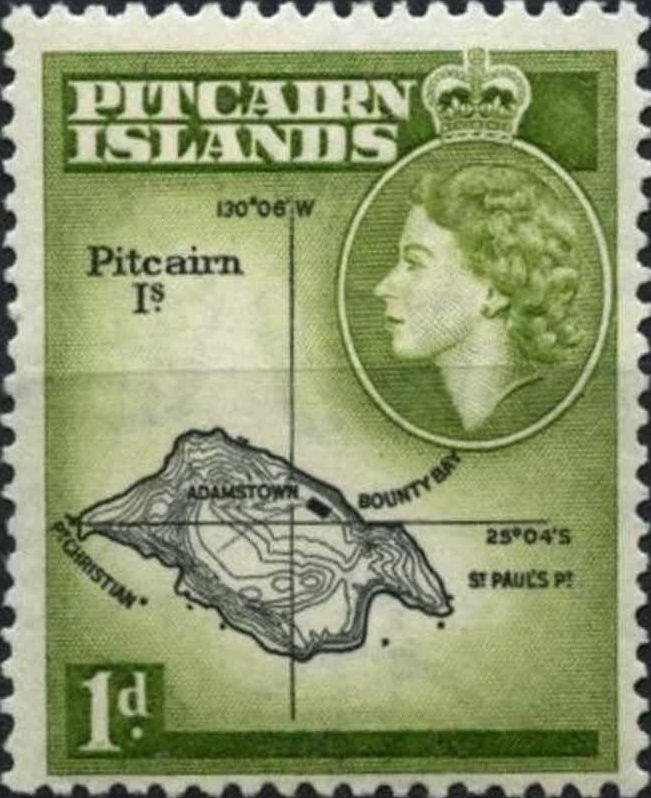
A 1957 Pitcairn Islands definitive stamp showing Pitcairn Island

The first 1940 set of stamps consisted of eight denominations, with two additional denominations added in 1951. Printed by two British companies, they featured an image of King George VI alongside depictions of the island and one map locating Pitcairn. The 1957 definitive stamps, which consisted of 11 denominations, showed Queen Elizabeth II alongside further scenes depicting aspects of life on the island. One depicted the school-teacher's house, although it was initially mislabelled as the school itself.

Despite the reliance of the island on stamp sales to collectors, relatively few stamp designs were issued. By 1989, there were fewer than 300 designs that had been produced. Most of them have catalogue values of under US$10. The program issues up to six commemorative stamps per year, and new definitive stamps are issued on an average cycle of five years. Stamps designs were chosen to project a certain image of the islands to the outside world, such as telling the story of HMS Bounty, while avoiding spurious topics. Commemorative issues have been created to celebrate events in local history, developments in the British royal family such as weddings and jubilees, and local wildlife. Unsold stamps were destroyed to help preserve the collectible value of the stamps. One of three stamps issued on 15 November 1961 to commemorate the 100th anniversary of the return of some islanders from Norfolk Island was described as "cartographically the worst stamp ever perpetrated" by Dudley Stamp in 1966, in his speech as President to a meeting of the Royal Geographical Society, due to the poor representation of the shapes of both islands and the lack of scale.

== List of people on stamps of the Pitcairn Islands ==
Below is a partial list of people on stamps of the Pitcairn Islands arranged in alphabetical order:

- John Adams (1940)
- Thomas Adams (1969)
- Prince Andrew, Duke of York (1986)
- Princess Anne (1973)
- Captain William Bligh (1940)
- Charles, Prince of Wales (1981)
- Fletcher Christian (1940)
- Winston Churchill (1974)
- Diana, Princess of Wales (1981)
- Charles Dickens (2012)
- Prince Edward, Earl of Wessex (1999)
- Queen Elizabeth the Queen Mother (1949)
- Elizabeth II (1952)
- George VI (1940)
- Prince Philip, Duke of Edinburgh (1971)
- Robert Pitcairn (2017)
- Sarah, Duchess of York (1986)
- Sir Peter Scott (1992)
- Sophie, Countess of Wessex (1999)
- Chris Stewart (2009)
- John Tay (1986)
- George Washington (1976)
- Simon Young (1961)

== Gallery ==
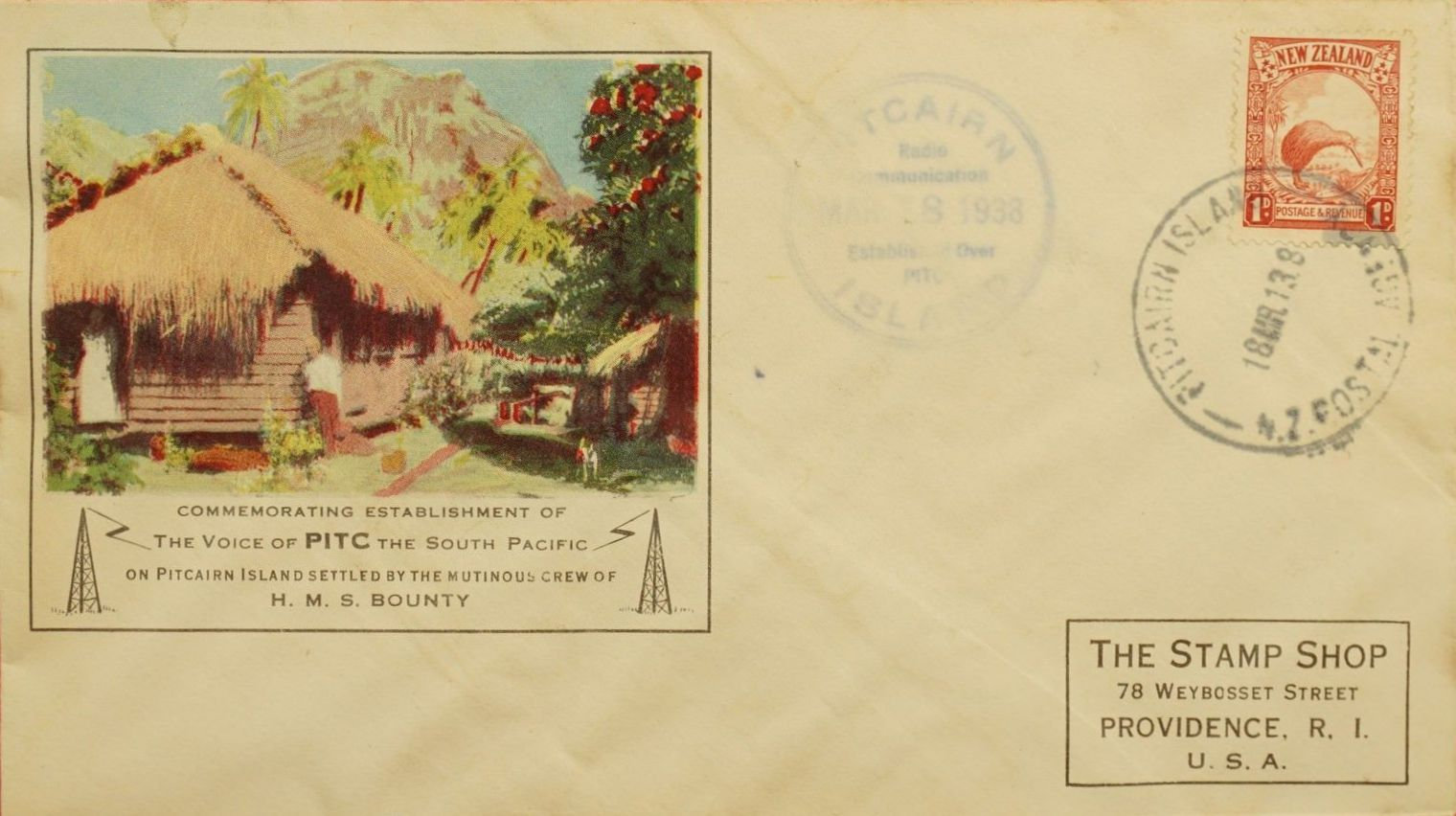
A 1938 first day cover celebrating the arrival of radio to Pitcairn Island, using a stamp from New Zealand with a Pitcairn Island cancellation

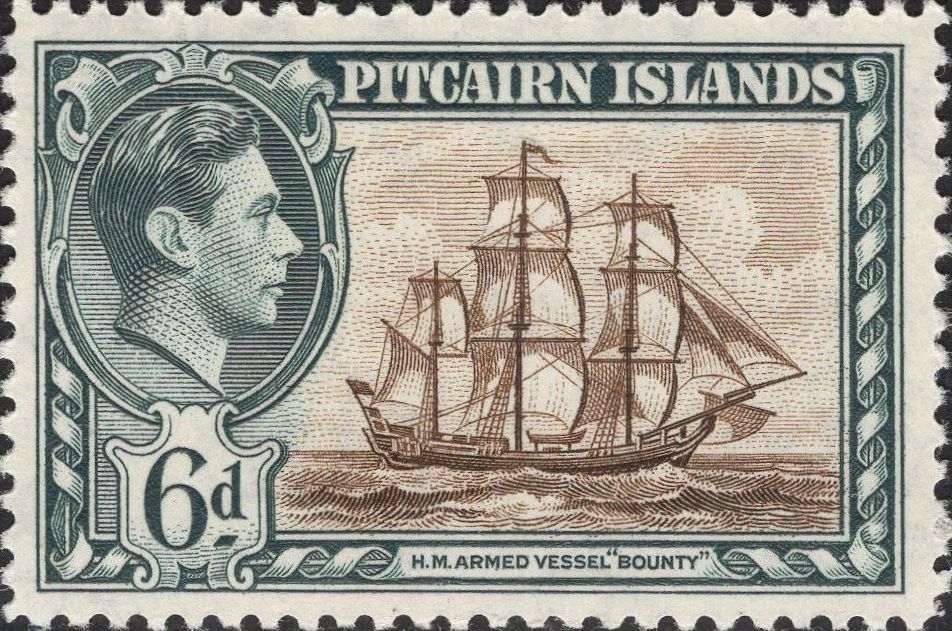
A 1940 stamp depicting HMS Bounty

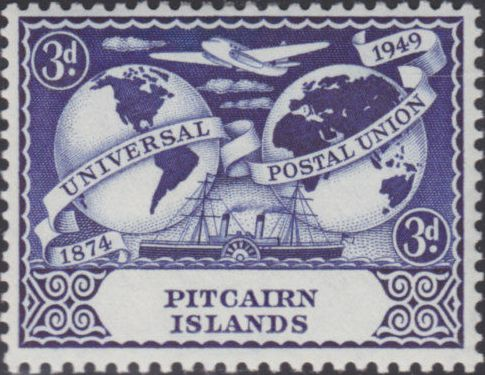
A 1949 stamp celebrating the 75th anniversary of the Universal Postal Union

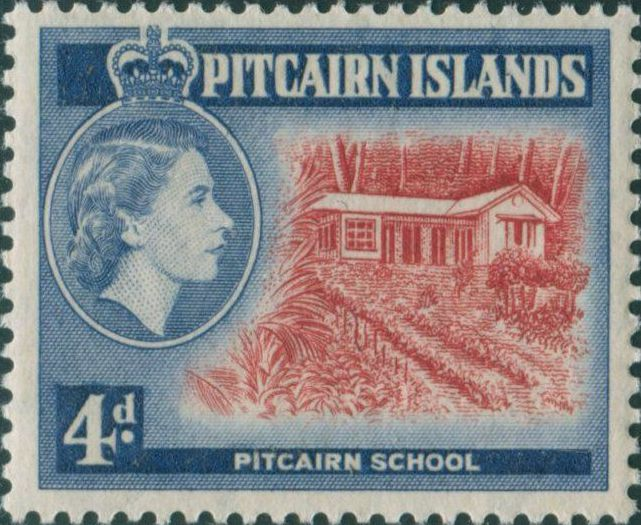
A 1957 stamp depicting the school-master's house, although it is erroneously labelled "Pitcairn School"
