= Errors, freaks, and oddities =

Mistakes that can occur during production of postage stamps

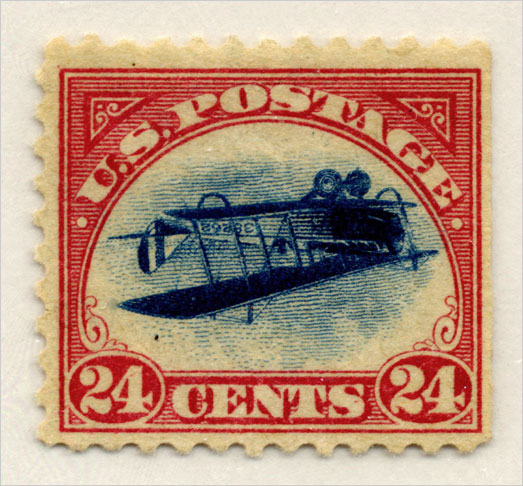
The "Inverted Jenny", issued in 1918.

In philately, errors, freaks, and oddities (EFO) collectively refer to the wide variety of mistakes that may occur during the production of postage stamps.

Postal authorities generally take some care to ensure that mistakes do not get out of the printing plant; to be valid, the EFO stamps must have been sold to a customer. Mistakes smuggled out by employees are called printer's waste, not recognized as legitimate stamps, and may be confiscated from collectors; the Nixon invert is a well-known recent example of an apparent new error that turned out to be simple theft by insiders. The authorities may attempt to lay hands on legitimately sold errors, as happened with the original Inverted Jenny sheet, but usually, collectors are smart enough to hang onto the windfall.

== Errors ==
A postage stamp error is any of several types of failure in the stamp printing process that results in stamps not having the intended appearance. Errors include use of the wrong colors, wrong denominations, missing parts of the design, misplaced or inverted design elements, etc. The term "error" is typically reserved for obvious failures in the production process that (potentially) replicate over many stamps, while unique errors or poor quality are known as "freaks" or "oddities". Printing plate flaws, such as cracks, wear, or even constant flaws, and plate repairs, such as re-entries, are also not considered errors.

Genuine errors are uncommon or even rare; postal administrations have several layers of quality control and inspection, and most printing problems are addressed before the stamps ever reach the public. A particular error may only exist in a few dozen copies, and some well-known errors, such as the Treskilling Yellow, are considered unique. They are prized by collectors, with some fetching prices thousands of times higher than the normal stamp of their type.

Errors are known at every stage of production, starting from design, to engraving, to replication of the die, to printing itself, and to perforation. In theory, gumming errors are possible, in practice used stamps have no gum, so any error would become undetectable.

The largest run of an error on a postage stamp is the 2011 United States 'Forever Statue of Liberty Stamp'. The stamp shows the replica of the Statue of Liberty in Las Vegas rather than the original Statue of Liberty in New York. The stamp was released in December 2010 and the error was not noticed until March 2011. The error was identified by Sunipix, a stock photo agency in Texas. Ten and a half billion of the error stamps were produced.

Collectors understand that a minor error in one stamp catalog might not be considered an error at all in another catalog. Additionally, no definitions of the terms freaks and oddities are universally accepted within the EFO community. John Hotchner has authored many respected articles about this subject that provide clarity.

The following is a list of the major types of errors.

- Design error: The picture may be of the wrong subject, maps may show wrong borders, the inscription may be factually wrong, text may be misspelled, etc.
- Value error or substituted subject: A die composed of multiple elements has the wrong elements mixed together, as for instance a low-value denomination being used on a design intended only for high values.
- Omission error: Part of the stamp's design is missing.
  - Missing color: Associated with printing processes which print the stamp in several different colors.
  - Missing overprint: A stamp valid for postage only when overprinted but with a missing overprint.
- Double impression: Stamp, or overprint, was printed twice, one impression offset from the other.
- Invert error: Part of the stamp is printed upside-down.
  - Inverted overprint: The overprint on the stamp is printed upside-down.
- Color error: Stamp is printed in the wrong color(s).
- Paper error: Stamp is printed on the wrong type of paper which, e.g., may have a different watermark or color than intended.
- Perforation error: Perforations are missing on one or several sides or put in the wrong place (e.g. diagonally). As perforations may be removed by cutting them off, imperforate errors are collected in pairs.
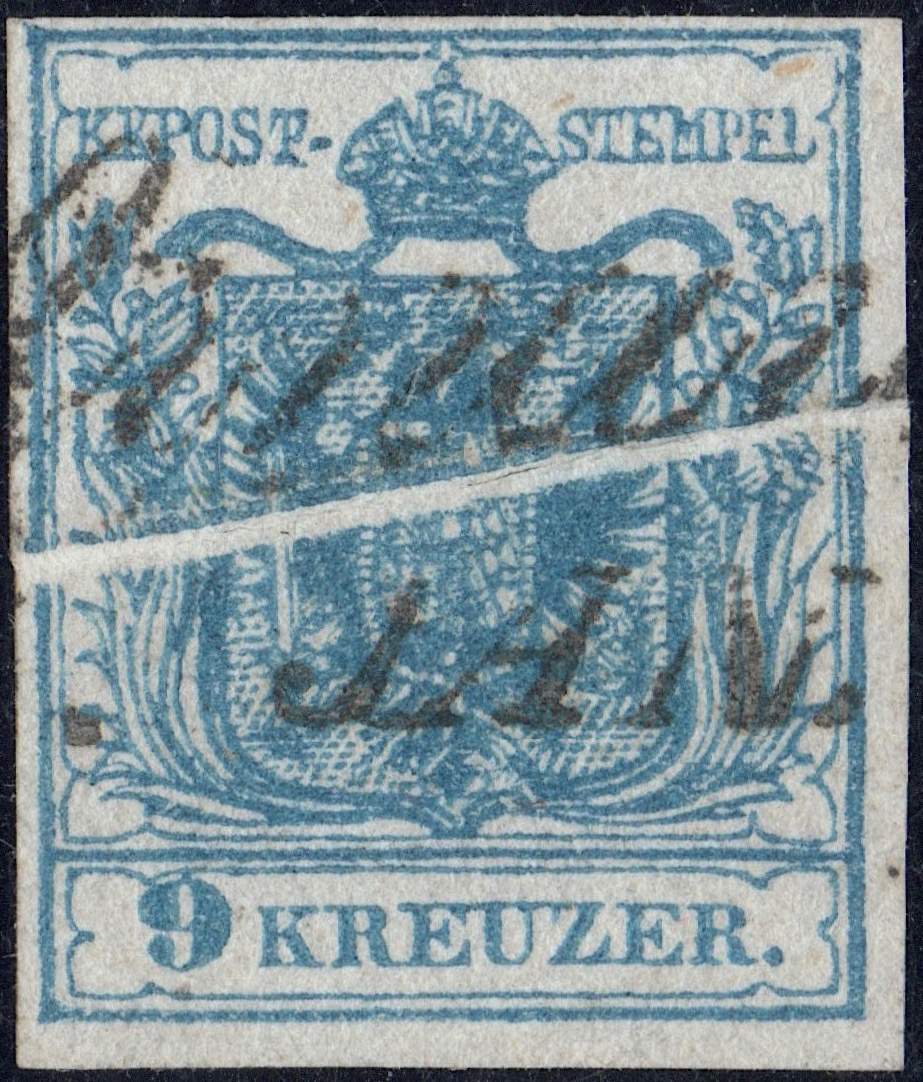
A diagonal paper fold (Austria 1850).

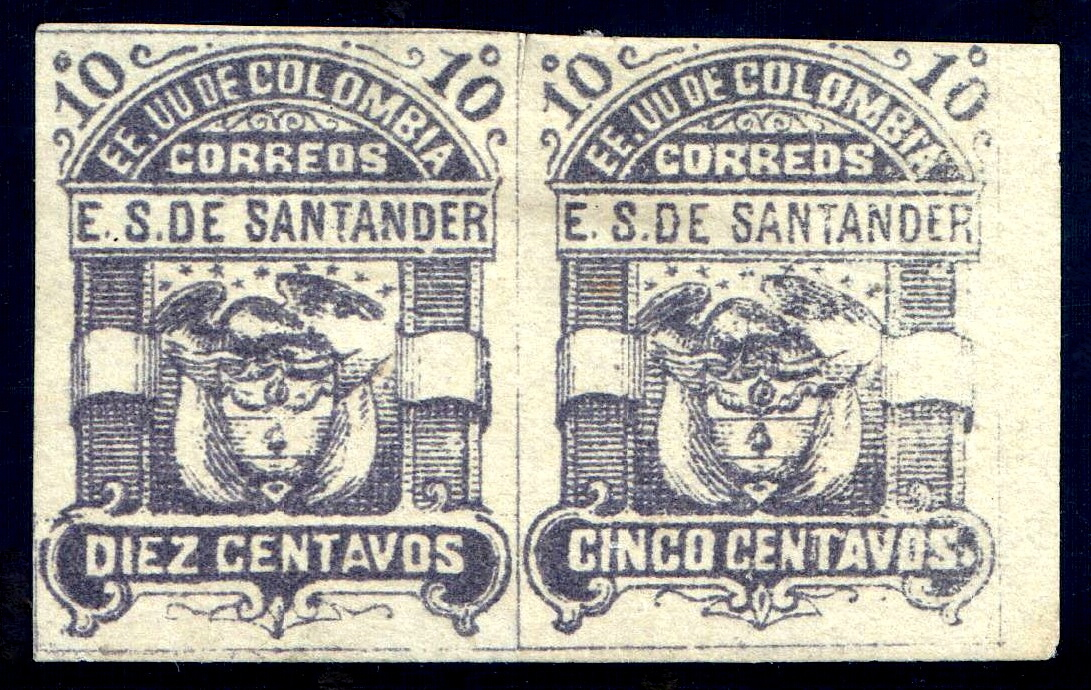
Cliché error pair, right stamp with “Cinco” instead of “Diez" (Santander 1886).

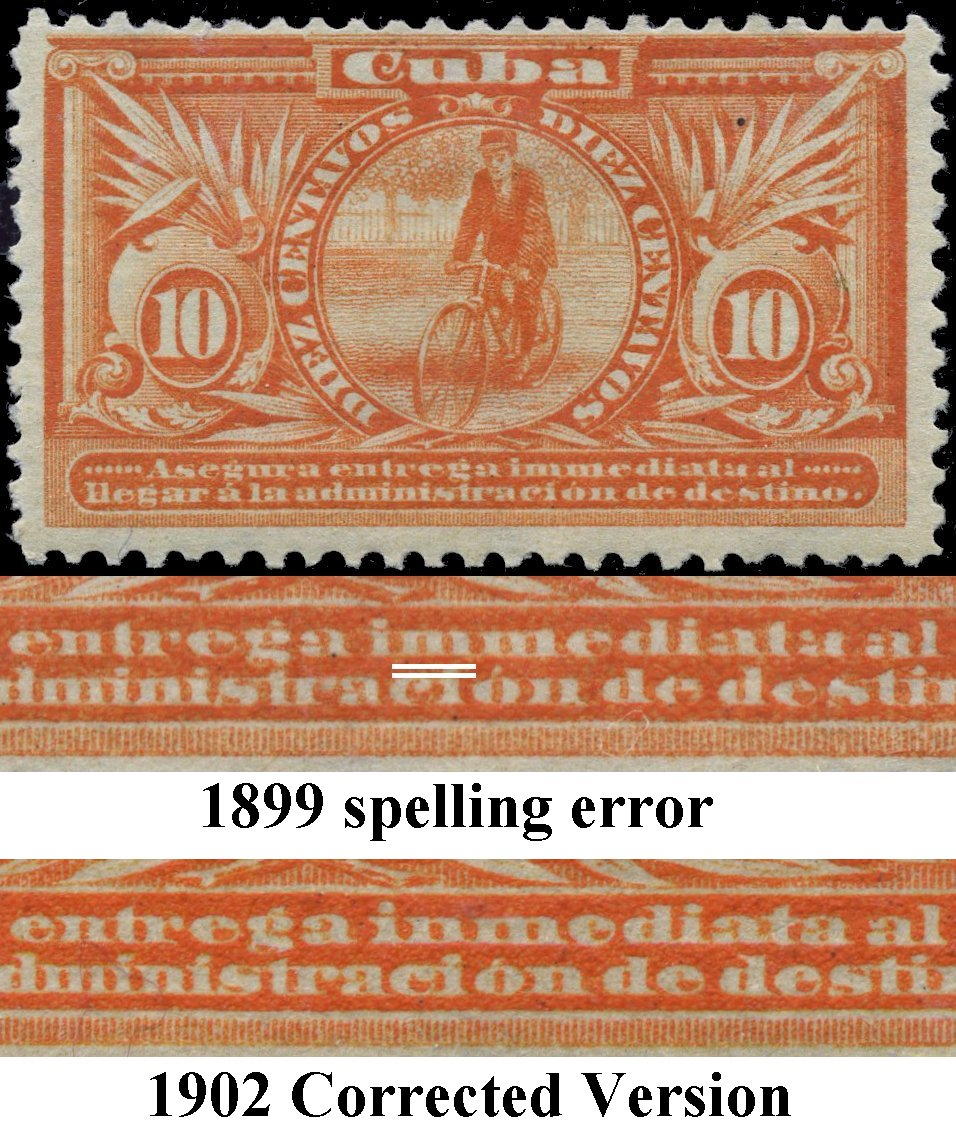
The Spanish word "inmediata" was misspelled on this stamp ("immediata"), issued in 1899. This was corrected when the Cuban Republic had it reprinted in November, 1902.

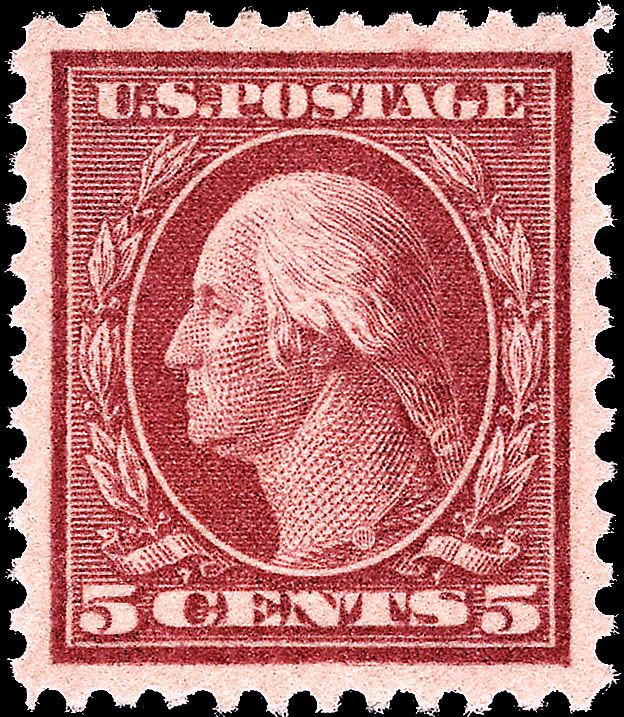
5-cent value error, with a 5-cent die wrongly placed in a 2-cent sheet (U.S. ca. 1917).

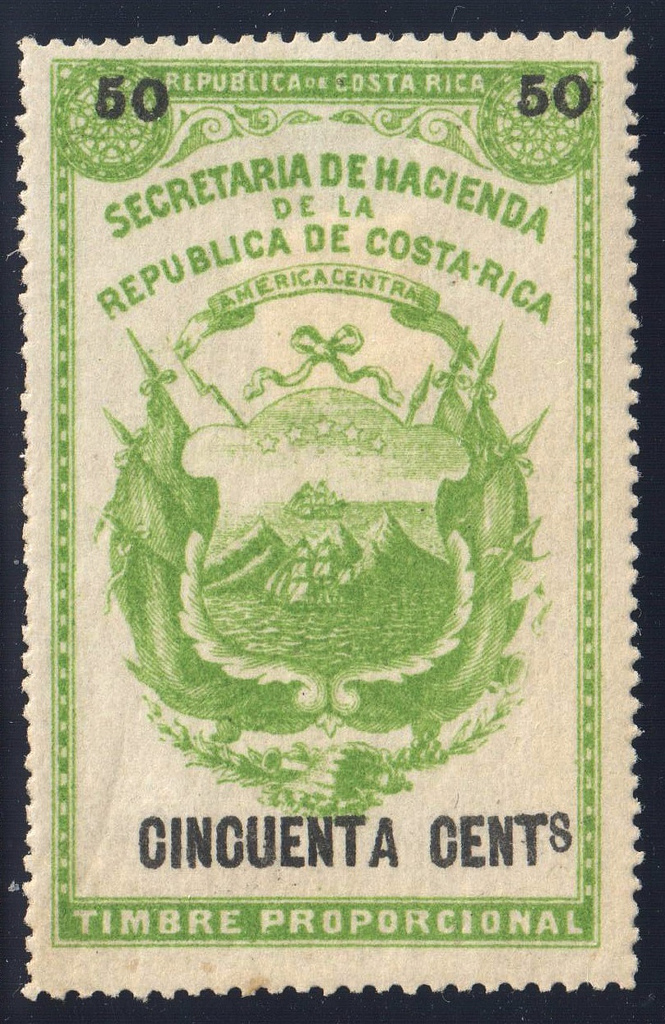
50 centavos color error, green instead of red (Costa Rica 1870).

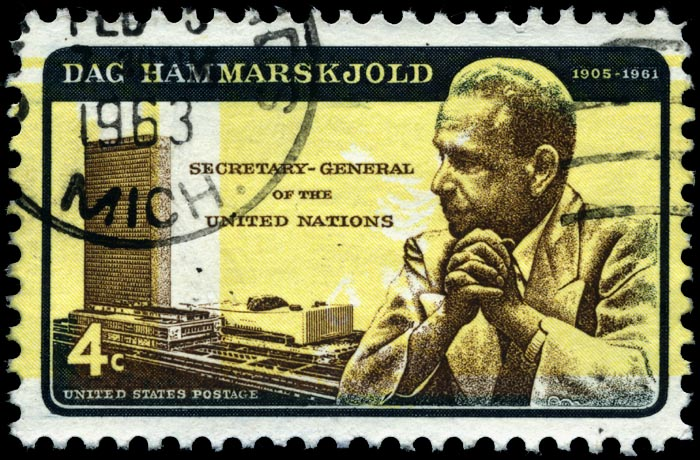
Once the yellow-inverted error Dag Hammarskjöld memorial stamp was discovered, 40,270,000 were printed to prevent speculation. Only the original unintentionally printed specimens are considered to be errors. (U.S. 1962)

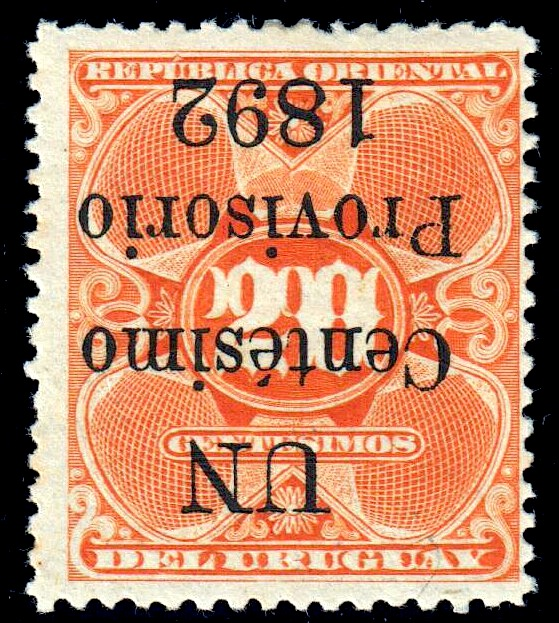
Inverted overprint (Uruguay 1892).

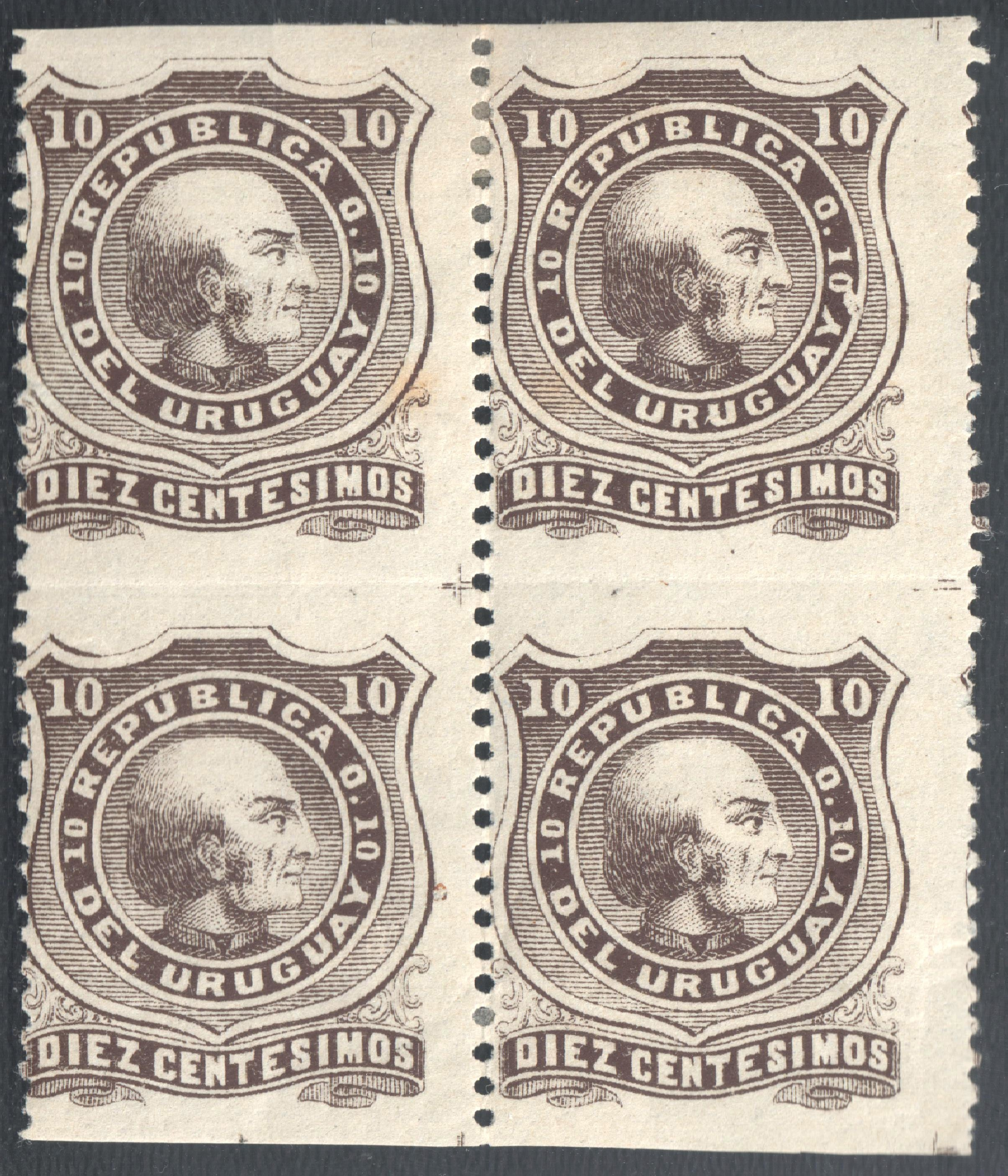
Missing horizontal perforation (Uruguay 1883).

== Freaks ==
A freak is a one-time mishap in the production process. Freaks include paper folds resulting in half-printed half-blank stamps, "crazy perfs" running diagonally across stamps, and insects embedded in stamps, underneath the ink.

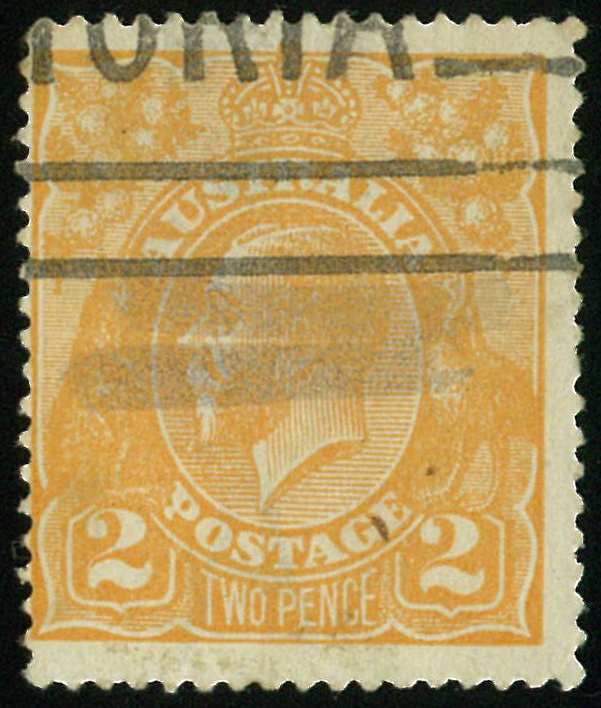
Stamp freak, strange matter embedded in paper's stamp above number 2 (Australia 2d king George V orange die 1, 1920).

== Oddities ==
An oddity is something that is within the bounds of usability for the stamp, but still has a distinctive appearance. The usual sort of oddity is misregistration on a multi-colored stamp, which can result in shirts apparently with two sets of buttons, eyes above the top of a person's head, and so forth. These can be extremely common. The Canadian Christmas stamp of 1898, depicting a map of the world with British possessions in red, is famous for unusual color oddities that appear to claim all of Europe, or the United States, or central Asia for Britain.
