= Postage stamp reprint =

In philately a reprint is a new printing of a postage stamp from the original plates. A reprint is to be distinguished from a new print which is not printed from the original medium. A reprint may or may not be valid as postage.

== Background ==
While it is common for a postal service to order print-runs as stocks are diminished by the public, it is also the usual practice to only use a given design for a small period of time so as to discourage forgery, and then to destroy the printing plates.

Sometimes the authorities keep the plates on hand, and reuse them later. The reasons have included:

- Problems with a new design, resulting in a sudden need for additional stamps
- Additional copies for stamp collectors
- Souvenirs for stamp shows, government meetings, etc. (these are often printed on cards rather than stamp paper)

== Identifying reprints ==
As reprints are produced from the original plates, it can be very difficult to distinguish them from the original printing. Frequently subtle details matter, such the type of paper, type of gum, or color shades. Reprints often appear fresh and bright compared to the originals.

== Official reprints ==
In a few cases, the postal authorities have produced official reproductions, copies of an existing design created on new plates. A notable example of this occurred in 1875 in the United States, where all stamps issued to date were reproduced or reprinted with the intention of making them more readily available to collectors. (The actual numbers printed were small, and so most of the reissues are now rarer and more expensive than the originals they resemble.) In 1962, to prevent people profiting from the issue of an invert stamp error, the United States Post Office Department intentionally reprinted 40,270,000 copies the yellow Dag Hammarskjöld invert stamp.

== Unofficial reprints ==
Unofficial or illegitimate reprints also exist, being produced by private printers who were contracted to print stamps, but retained the plates for their own use. The classic example is the Seebeck reprints of Latin American stamps produced in great numbers around the end of the 19th century.

== See also ==
- New print (philately)
