= Plate flaw =

Recurring stamp variety caused by a printing plate defect

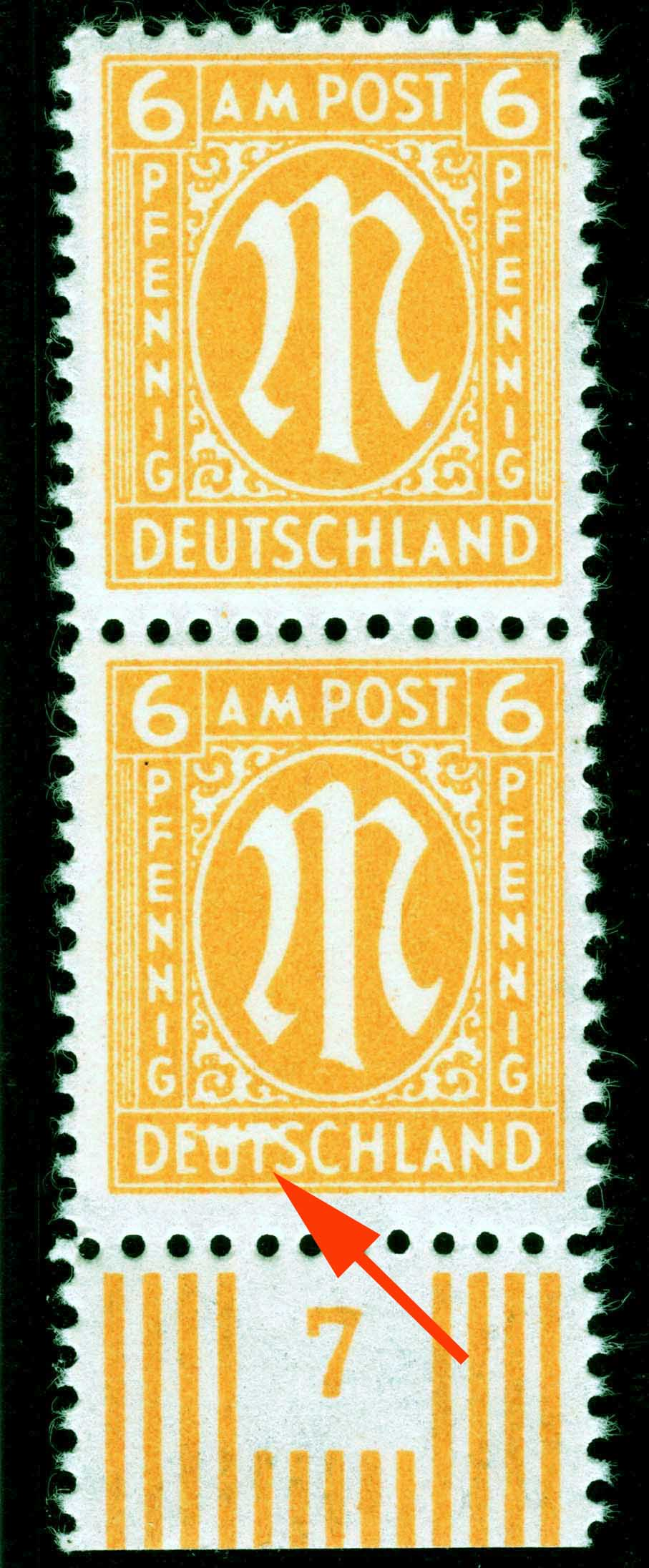
Comparison of a normal impression and a plate flaw in the letters “UT” of “DEUTSCHLAND” on a 1945 AM Post stamp

In philately, a plate flaw is an unintended recurring feature in the printed design of a postage stamp, caused by a defect, damage or wear of the printing plate. It appears in the corresponding position on successive sheets printed from the affected plate.

Plate flaws are generally treated as plate varieties. In the classification of errors, freaks and oddities (EFO), plate varieties are usually regarded as oddities rather than as postage stamp errors.

== Cause and identification ==
A plate flaw may have been present when the plate was manufactured or may develop during printing through cracking, wear or accidental damage. Its appearance may change as the plate continues to deteriorate. A flaw may also disappear or become less distinct after the affected impression has been repaired.

Unlike a plate flaw, a temporary printing mishap does not consistently recur in the same position or form. Such non-constant abnormalities may result from folds, uneven inking or other accidental events during production and are generally classified as freaks rather than plate varieties.

Because a plate flaw is constant, it may help identify the original position of a stamp within a sheet or the plate from which it was printed. This process is known as plating. Other constant characteristics—including the position of letters, guide lines, retouching and plate repairs—may also be used for plating and are not necessarily plate flaws themselves.

== Examples ==
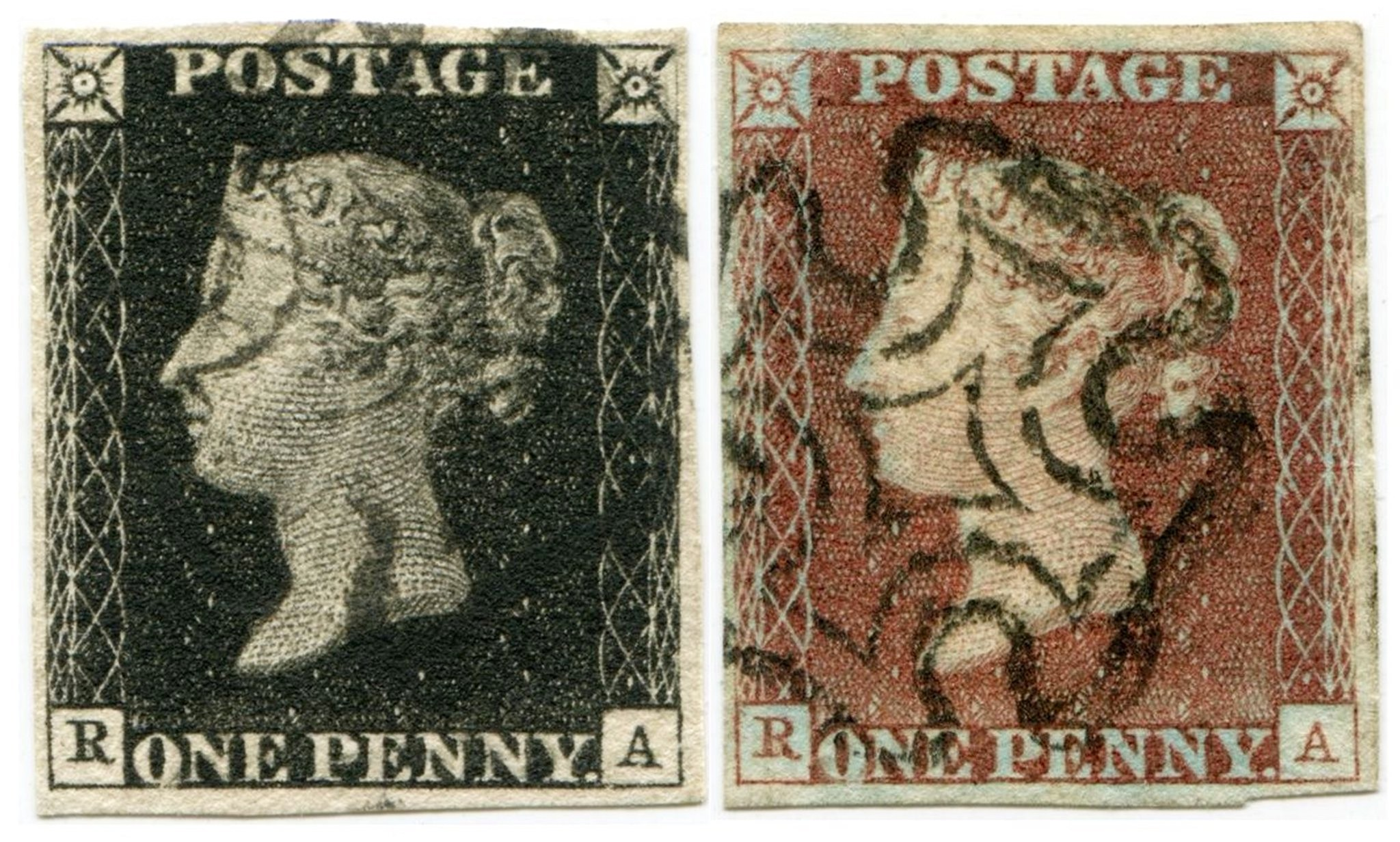
The same “RA” position of plate 10 on a Penny Black and a Penny Red. Both show the white “O flaw”; the lower-left letter “R” was cut from an original “P”.

Plate flaws occurred on the earliest postage stamps. Plate 1a of the British Penny Black, completed in April 1840, had characteristic missing or enlarged rays in the upper-left corner star. These ray flaws help distinguish plate 1a from its repaired state, known as plate 1b.

Another early example is the white O flaw within the word “ONE”. It occurs in several states on plates 8 to 10 used for the Penny Black and Penny Red. On many impressions the flaw was reduced or removed when the plate was repaired.

The Large Hermes Head stamps of Greece are another extensively studied issue. The Hellenic Philatelic Society records specialist publications and international exhibits devoted to their plate flaws.

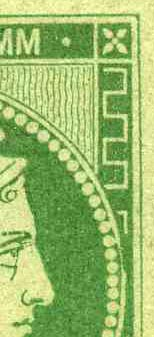
The “narrow circle” flaw on a 5-lepta Large Hermes Head

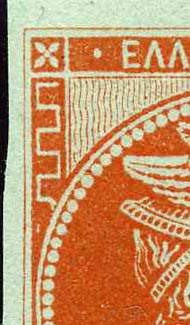
The Greek ornament touching the circle on a 10-lepta Large Hermes Head
