= J. Edward Day =

American politician (1914–96)

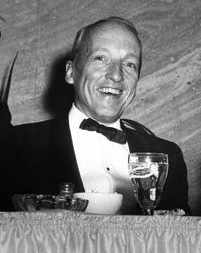
- Day in 1961

58th United States Postmaster General
- In office January 21, 1961 – August 9, 1963
- President: John F. Kennedy
- Preceded by: Arthur Summerfield
- Succeeded by: John A. Gronouski

Personal details
- Born: James Edward Day; October 11, 1914 Jacksonville, Illinois, U.S.
- Died: October 29, 1996 (aged 82) Hunt Valley, Maryland, U.S.
- Party: Democratic
- Spouse: Mary Burgess
- Education: University of Chicago (BA); Harvard University (LLB)

James Edward Day (October 11, 1914 – October 29, 1996) was an American lawyer and business executive, most widely known as the United States Postmaster General under whose leadership the ZIP code was introduced.

== Early years and career ==
James Edward Day was born in Jacksonville, Illinois. He received a B.A. from University of Chicago in 1935, then attended Harvard Law School, graduating in 1938. Following law school, Day joined Sidley, Austin, Burgess and Harper in Chicago, where he became a close friend of Adlai Stevenson. In 1940 he joined the Naval Reserve and trained as an officer; he was called to active duty as an ensign in 1942, and was discharged as a lieutenant in 1945.

Day returned to Sidley Austin and in 1948, following Stevenson's election as governor of Illinois, Day worked as a legislative assistant and later as Illinois insurance commissioner. In 1953, he left state government for a job with Prudential Insurance Company, taking over its western operations four years later.

== Postmaster General ==
I went to Harvard, I served in the Navy and my wife went to Vassar.

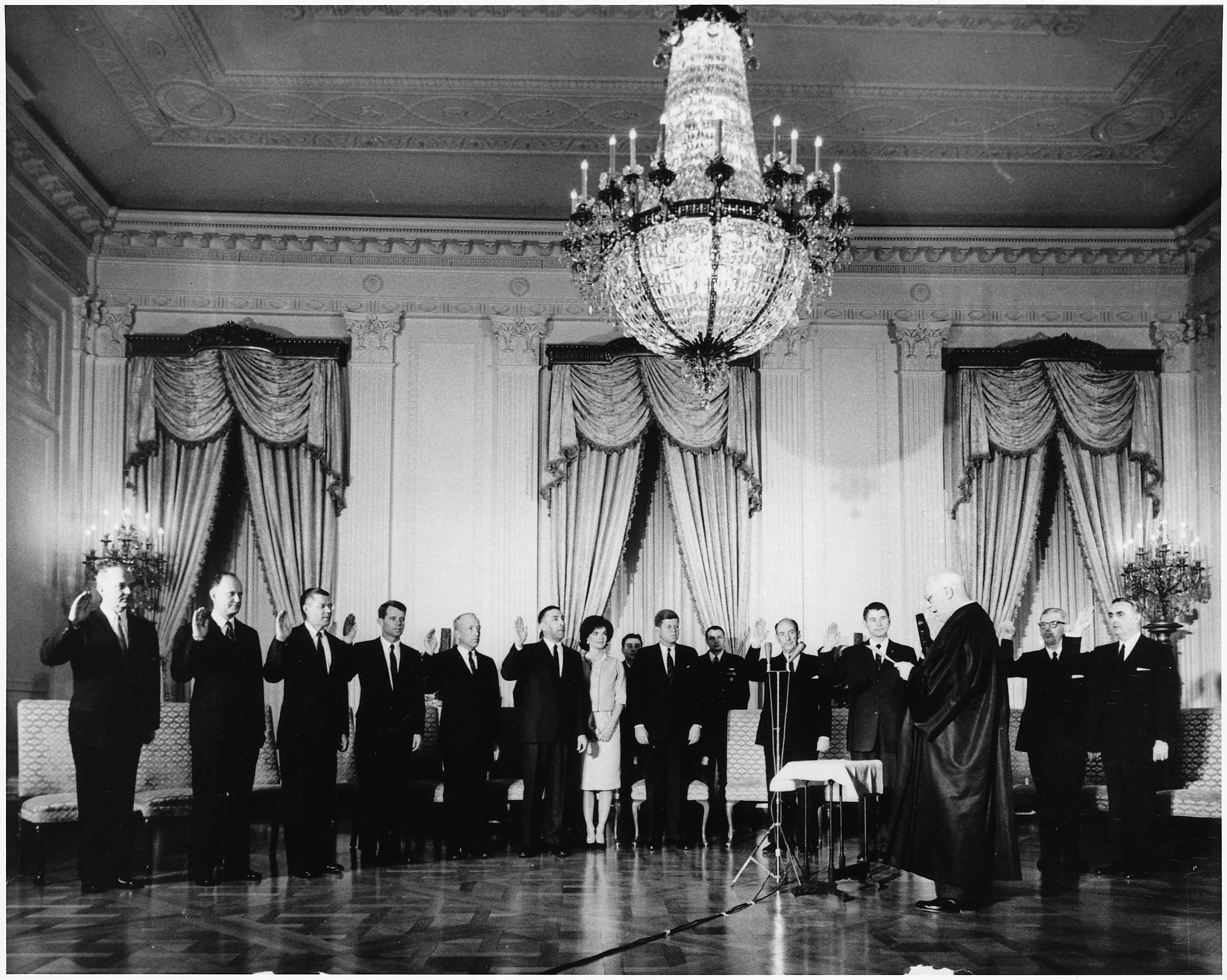
Day joins the rest of Kennedy's newly formed cabinet in the East Room of the White House as they are sworn in on January 21, 1961, by Chief Justice Earl Warren.

In 1961 he became U.S. Postmaster General in the administration of John F. Kennedy. There, he was responsible for reducing the postal deficit, introducing ZIP codes, and improving service and employee morale; towards the latter he signed its first labor contract, with the National Rural Letter Carriers' Association.

During his time at the job the Dag Hammarskjöld invert stamp was printed and reprinted. In August 1963, he resigned as Postmaster General, saying it was hard to live on the $25,000 salary the office paid. In 1965 he published a light-hearted memoir about his Postmaster General service, My Appointed Round: 929 days as Postmaster General (New York: Holt, Rinehart and Winston, LCCN 65-14437).

== Return to private practice ==
Immediately after leaving the federal government, Day returned to private law practice and joined the firm of Sidley Austin Burgess and Smith. In this capacity he helped establish the firm's Washington, DC office. His clients included the Advertising Mail Marketing Association, an organization that particularly benefited from the ZIP code's use in targeting mass marketing campaigns by income level.

Day's departure resulted from a perceived slight by his partners following the merger of Sidley with the Chicago law firm Liebman, Williams, Bennett, Baird and Minow. Day sued his former partners in a case that went to the United States Court of Appeals for the District of Columbia Circuit. Day v. Sidley & Austin, 548 F.2d 1018 (D.C.Cir. 1976). The court found that Day suffered from a bruised ego but that the facts failed to establish a legal cause of action. Day joined Squire, Sanders & Dempsey in 1973, where he remained until he retired in 1984. Day also served as legal counsel for the Association of Postal Commerce for a number of years until 1986; the association subsequently established the annual "J. Edward Day Award", given in recognition of "distinguished service to the nation's postal community."

Day died of a heart attack on October 29, 1996, in Hunt Valley, Maryland.
