= Revenue stamps of New Zealand =

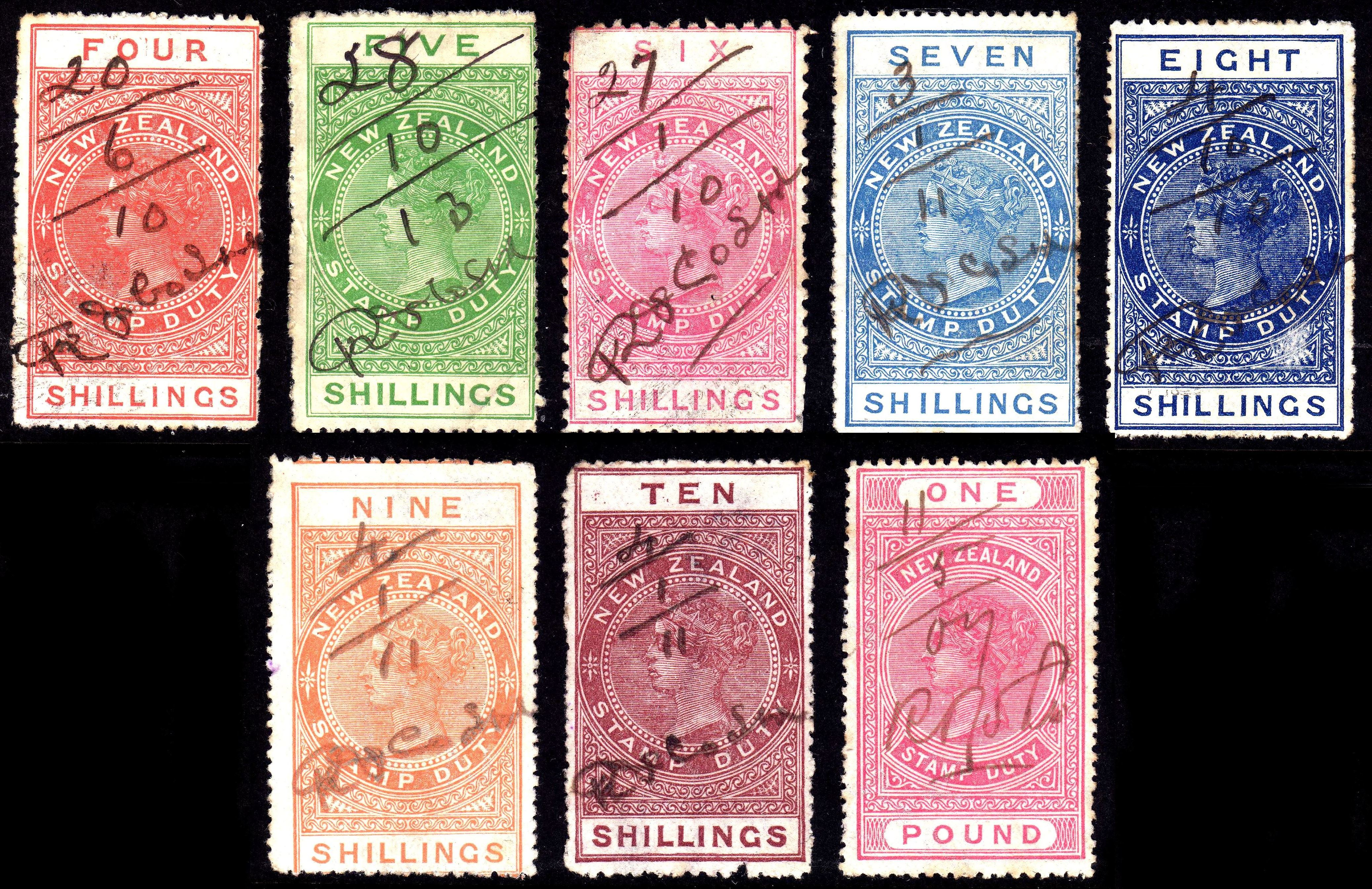
Revenue stamps portraying Queen Victoria, in use from 1880 to 1931.

New Zealand first issued revenue stamps on 1 January 1867 and their general use continued until the early 1950s. The only Revenue Stamp series still in use today is the Game Bird Habitat stamp which is used for payment of the Gun License for the duck shooting season which begins the first weekend of May. There were various types of fiscal stamps for different taxes.

== Stamp Duty ==
=== Queen Victoria ===
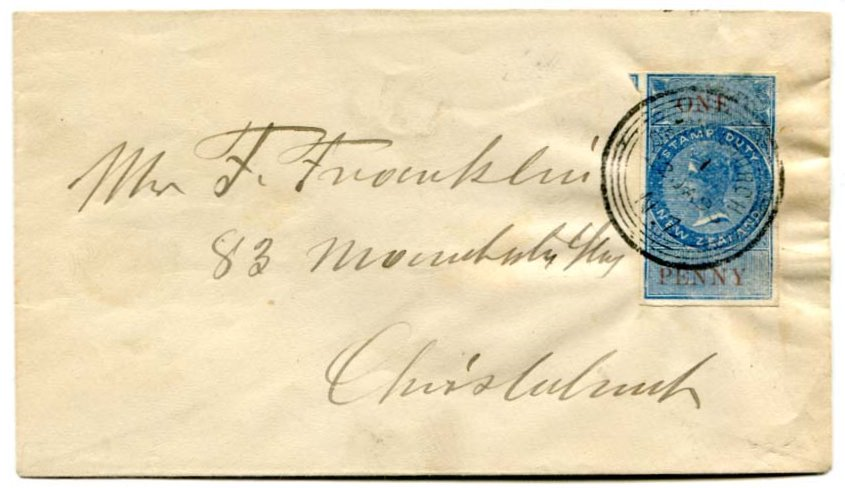
A New Zealand revenue stamp postally used in Christchurch in 1893.

New Zealand's first revenues were imperforate long designs portraying Queen Victoria and inscribed STAMP DUTY NEW ZEALAND. This series was issued on 1 January 1867, however some copies are known used in December 1866. In all, the first set consisted of seventy eight stamps with denominations ranging from 1d to £10. In May 1867, these stamps were reissued perforated 12½, and this time more values were added up to £50. Various changes in the perforation and watermark were also issued around this time. These were replaced by stamps printed by a new die in 1871, with minor differences in the design.

On 15 June 1878, a penny lilac revenue stamp was issued in a design based on that of British revenues. On 14 December 1878, this was replaced by a similar stamp in the same design but in blue.

In 1880, a new design, also portraying Queen Victoria, was issued. These remained in use for over fifty years, and therefore many printings exist with different perforations, watermarks and papers. Many different denominations were issued ranging from 4d to £1000. From 1 April 1882 these became valid for postal use, and postally used copies generally command higher prices than fiscally used ones.

Around 1884, the 1867 imperforate design was reissued in gold, and it was individually printed with the required value at a particular point in time. Government records indicate that the lowest value ordered was £389, and the highest £190,225.

=== Arms ===
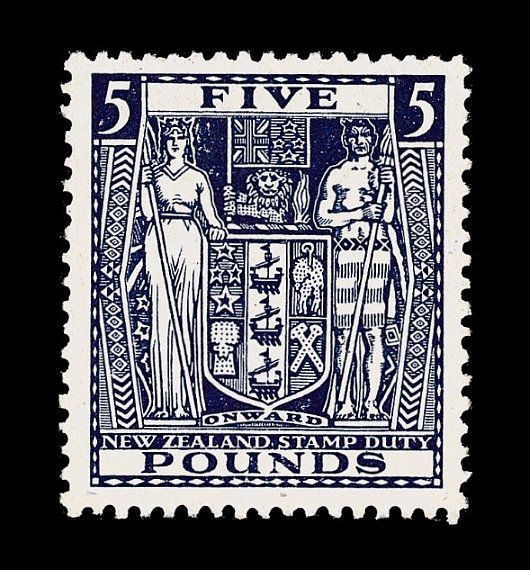
£5 blue Arms type

In 1931, a new design featuring the coat of arms was issued. Fifty values from 1s3d to £1000 were issued, and like the Queen Victoria design, the lower values were valid for postage. Higher values were technically valid for postage as well, but they did not see postal use simply because the denominations were higher than the postal rates.

In 1939, some of these were issued overprinted with their face value in large black numerals, in order to help distinguish these values from others which had a similar colour. Twenty eight of these were issued ranging from 3s6d to £1000.

In 1935, the Arms design was issued in gold in a larger format and imperforate for use as high values. The value was printed to order, and government records indicate that 1897 different values were issued, many of them unique. The lowest value known is £2192 and the highest £150,000.

The Arms design was reissued in decimal currency in 1967. This time only four values were issued: $4, $6, $8 and $10. These were also valid for postal use and were often used to mail parcels. There are various watermarks and papers for this issue.

== Other types ==
Apart from Stamp Duty revenues, New Zealand also had other types of revenues. These were never valid for postal use.

Various types of duty had their own stamps which were either postage or revenue stamps overprinted, or stamp duty designs with altered inscriptions. These were used for:

- Ad Valorem - Estate Duty (1868)
- Counterpart (1870-1939)
- Denoting (1920-1939)
- Duty Paid in Full (1868)
- Fine Paid (1867-1947)
- Mortgagee's Indemnity Fee (1927-1947)
- Not Liable (1875-1931)
- Passport Fee (1926-1937)
- Penalty Paid (1875)

Special designs were also issued to pay for the following:

- Law Courts (1876)
- Lands and Deeds (1877-1879)
- Honey Seals (1938-1967)
- Fruit Inspection Fee (1950)

In 1878 a series of large Beer Duty stamps portraying Queen Victoria was issued. These were replaced by a rectangular design in 1885, again with the Queen's portrait. This was replaced by a similar issue portraying King Edward VII in 1908.

Various stamps inscribed UNEMPLOYMENT RELIEF, EMPLOYMENT or SOCIAL SECURITY were issued between 1931 and 1958 to pay for wages tax. Many of these were overprinted with a control overprint with the year of issue. Various airports have issued their own stamps to pay for the airport departure fee since 1971. New Zealand has also issued Game Bird Habitat stamps annually since 1994. Despite not being postage stamps, these are marketed by New Zealand Post and first day covers are also produced.

== See also ==
- Postal fiscal stamp
- Postage stamps and postal history of New Zealand
