= Postage stamps and postal history of the Ross Dependency =

Ross Dependency stamps have been issued by New Zealand postal authorities for use on mail from Scott Base since 1957. Overprinted New Zealand stamps had been used for mail on two earlier expeditions to the region.

== King Edward VII Land ==
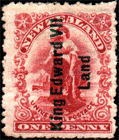
King Edward VII Land stamp

Before leaving New Zealand on the 1908 British Antarctic Expedition, Captain Ernest Shackleton was appointed as a New Zealand Postmaster, and provided with 23,492 New Zealand "Penny Universal" stamps, overprinted "King Edward VII Land", for use on the expedition.

Postmaster Shackleton was provided with a circular date stamp, "BRIT. ANTARCTIC EXPD.", with "N.Z.", and time, date, year on four lines in the centre, which used to postmark mail from the continent.

Due to ice conditions, Shackleton was unable to reach King Edward VII Land, and established his base in McMurdo Sound.

== Victoria Land ==
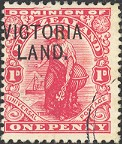
Victoria Land stamp

Before leaving New Zealand on the Terra Nova Expedition in 1910, Captain Robert Falcon Scott was appointed as a Postmaster. 24,000 New Zealand "Penny Dominion" stamps (200 sheets) were overprinted "VICTORIA LAND.", of which 23,171 were carried by Postmaster Scott on the expedition.

During 1912, an additional 2,400 Edward VII ½d stamps were overprinted, and 1,940 of these were carried aboard the Terra Nova when it returned to Antarctica in the 1912–13 summer season.

== Ross Dependency: 1957–1987 ==
The first stamps inscribed Ross Dependency were issued on January 11, 1957, in conjunction with the New Zealand Antarctic Expedition, led by Sir Edmund Hillary (part of the Commonwealth Trans-Antarctic Expedition). Before the expedition left New Zealand, on 23 November 1956, Hillary had been appointed postmaster. When the expedition chose the site for Scott Base, a post office was established, initially in a tent.

The initial set of stamps consisted of four stamps, in the denominations 3d, 4d, 8d, and 1s 6d. When New Zealand adopted a decimal currency in 1967, the stamps were reissued in denominations of 2c, 3c, 7c, and 15c.

A new definitive set, consisting of six stamps denominated 3c, 4c, 5c, 8c, 10c and 18c was issued in 1972. The next set, issued in 1982 to mark the 25th anniversary of Scott Base, consisted of 5c, 10c, 20c, 30c, 40c and 50c stamps.

The post office at Scott Base was closed in 1987 as part of the rationalisation of New Zealand Post. Mail from the base was handled in Christchurch, and the issuing of "Ross Dependency" stamps ceased.

== Ross Dependency: 1994–present ==
New Zealand Post resumed the issue of stamps inscribed "Ross Dependency" in 1994, "due to local and international demand." A definitive set was issued in 1994, and pictorial sets of five or six stamps have been issued annually since then.

The denominations match those of contemporary New Zealand stamps. However, the stamps are not generally valid on New Zealand mail. Mail from the Ross Dependency is processed by the "Ross Dependency Agency", located at a post office in Christchurch. Members of the public (mostly philatelists and stamp dealers) are able to post items bearing Ross Dependency stamps at this office.

Mail is canceled with the inscription "Ross Dependency Agency, Christchurch."

== See also ==
- Postage stamps and postal history of New Zealand
