= Nixon invert =

US stamp variant

- A block of four plus selvage shows how the inverted portrait falls in between the stamps.
- Country of production: United States
- Nature of rarity: Printer's waste
- Face value: 32 cents
- Estimated value: US $$8,000-$10,000

The "Nixon invert" is a reputed invert error of the Richard Nixon memorial postage stamp issued by the United States Postal Service in 1995.

Originally reported in January 1996, the invert drew considerable attention; however, in December of that year, Clarence Robert Robie, a printing plant employee, was arrested on charges of having stolen the misprinted stamps from the plant where he worked. This meant that, rather than being a legitimate error mistakenly sold by the Postal Service, the inverts were printer’s waste—material taken from a printing plant or wastepaper destruction facility and sold illegally. While errors sold by the Postal Service are highly prized, printer’s waste is not and, as was the case with the Nixon invert, may be confiscated by authorities.

== Background ==
The 32¢ Nixon commemorative stamp was issued on April 26, 1995, following Richard Nixon's death the previous year. The stamps were designed by Daniel Schwarz and printed in combination offset-intaglio process by the Banknote Corporation of America. It was issued in panes of fifty.

Because of the Watergate scandal and Nixon's subsequent resignation, the stamps did not sell well, and some members of Congress even asked Postmaster General Marvin T. Runyon to not issue the stamps, but Runyon maintained that presidential memorial stamps were tradition and approved the stamp.

== Appearance ==
The "Nixon invert" shows the portrait of Richard Nixon, "USA," and the 32¢ denomination inverted relative to the printed name "Richard Nixon." The portrait was additionally shifted so that it was split across the stamp's perforations. The stamps were in mint condition, never hinged.

This inversion was made possible because the stamp was printed in two steps. First, the portrait and denomination combination was printed by Barton Press on a Heidelberg six-color sheet-fed offset press, then the stamps were sent to the American Bank Note Company's plant in Suffern, New York, where the intaglio inscription was applied using a Giori press. The Bank Note Company also perforated and finished the stamps.

== Sale ==
The stamp first came to public attention from an announcement from Christie's auction house in New York City. Christie's spokeswoman Laurie Dodge said that the stamp owner owned 160 of the misprinted stamps, but planned to auction a single stamp to gauge the market. Inverted stamps are extremely rare, and so the claim of 160 stamps and the lack of information surrounding the discovery generated both interest and skepticism.

Christie's had initially estimated that the initial stamp sale would fetch between $8,000 and $10,000, but bidding reached $14,500. With the 15 percent auctioneer's commission, the stamp finished up at $16,675.

Two days previously, dealer Dana Okey of San Diego had purchased 141 of the inverts from Christie's, and by April was selling them for $12,500, characterizing the response as "awesome."

The auction house did not supply the name of the consignor—a common practice.

== Theft and arrest ==
Clarence Robert Robie, a former cutting machine operator at BCA's Suffern plant, was arrested on December 12, 1996, and charged with theft of property made under contract for the United States (the initial removal of the 160 stamps from the Suffern plant) and transporting stolen property in interstate commerce (Robie had transported the stamps from New York to New Jersey in order to sell them to two separate dealers). He was convicted on both counts after a four-day trial in May 1997. Neither dealer was charged, as they were apparently unaware of the theft.

Robie first contacted William Langs, a prominent stamp dealer with a known interest in misprints, in March 1995 and told him he would be obtaining some "error stamps", though he did not specify what kind. In May, the pair met in New Jersey, and Robie told Langs that he would be acquiring inverted Nixon stamps from a woman who had purchased the stamps from a post office in Virginia (The official sale is crucial in designating a stamp error). They met again in June, and Langs received 120 inverts from Robie in exchange for $60,000 worth of rare US stamps. Later that month, after Robie complained about the stamps he had received, Langs gave him a check for $1,000 and additional rare stamps worth approximately $4,000-$5,000.

In August 1995, Robie contacted Gary Posner, another stamp dealer, in hopes of selling the remaining 40 stamps. The pair met in New Jersey and Robie again said the stamps had come from a woman in Virginia. Posner acquired the 40 stamps in exchange for $7,000 in cash and a collection of stamps with a retail value of approximately $12,000-$15,000. Posner later traded the inverts to Langs for other rare stamps. In November, Langs sold 141 of the Nixon inverts to a single dealer for $800,000 through an auction sale at Christie's.

Federal prosecutors identified the Nixon inverts as stolen material and the United States Postal Inspection Service recovered all but two of the inverts. Investigators said that one dealer reported that he had lost one of the stamps and another said that a stamp was lost in transit. Though these stamps may be in private collections, they are considered stolen government property and cannot be openly displayed or sold.
