= New print =

In philately a new print or afterprint is a new printing of a postage stamp not from the original printing plate, when the stamp is no longer sold at the post office counter for postage purposes.

Where a new printing is from the original medium it is classed as a reprint, but where the original medium is no longer available, perhaps because the original printing plates have been destroyed, it is classed as a new print or afterprint.

For instance, the 1856 10 kopek stamp from Finland was reprinted in 1862 by the same method as the original (typography) and from the original steel die. In 1892 the Russian Director of Posts and Telegraphs ordered the stamp to be printed again, however, the original die was not available and the stamp was therefore reproduced using lithography, making it a new print. Had the later stamp not been officially authorised it would be classed as a forgery.
