= 1904 Pictorial 4d Lake Taupo invert =

Rare inverted New Zealand postage stamp

4d Taupo inverted centre
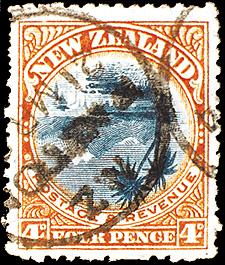
- Date of production: 1904
- Nature of rarity: Invert error
- No. in existence: 1
- Face value: 4d
- Estimated value: NZ$125,000

The 1904 Pictorial 4d Lake Taupo invert is an invert error on a postage and revenue stamp issued by New Zealand which is considered to be the country's rarest stamp. The centre vignette is inverted in relation to the outer frame. The stamp was discovered in a schoolboy album in 1930 and no other copy has been found since then.

The 4d stamp depicts Lake Taupō in New Zealand's North Island. It was part of the first pictorial series originally issued in 1898 but reissued in different colours and sizes in 1899 and 1900. The same design was used for a 1d value issued in 1898.

The sole example is postally used, postmarked Picton 1904.

== Previous owners ==
- Jack Dennett (the discoverer)
- Marquis De Rosny
- Robert W. Lyman
- New Zealand Post

In 2010 NZ Post deposited the stamp in the New Zealand national museum Te Papa on a long term loan.

== See also ==
- List of postage stamps
