= Dag Hammarskjöld invert =

American postage stamp with design error

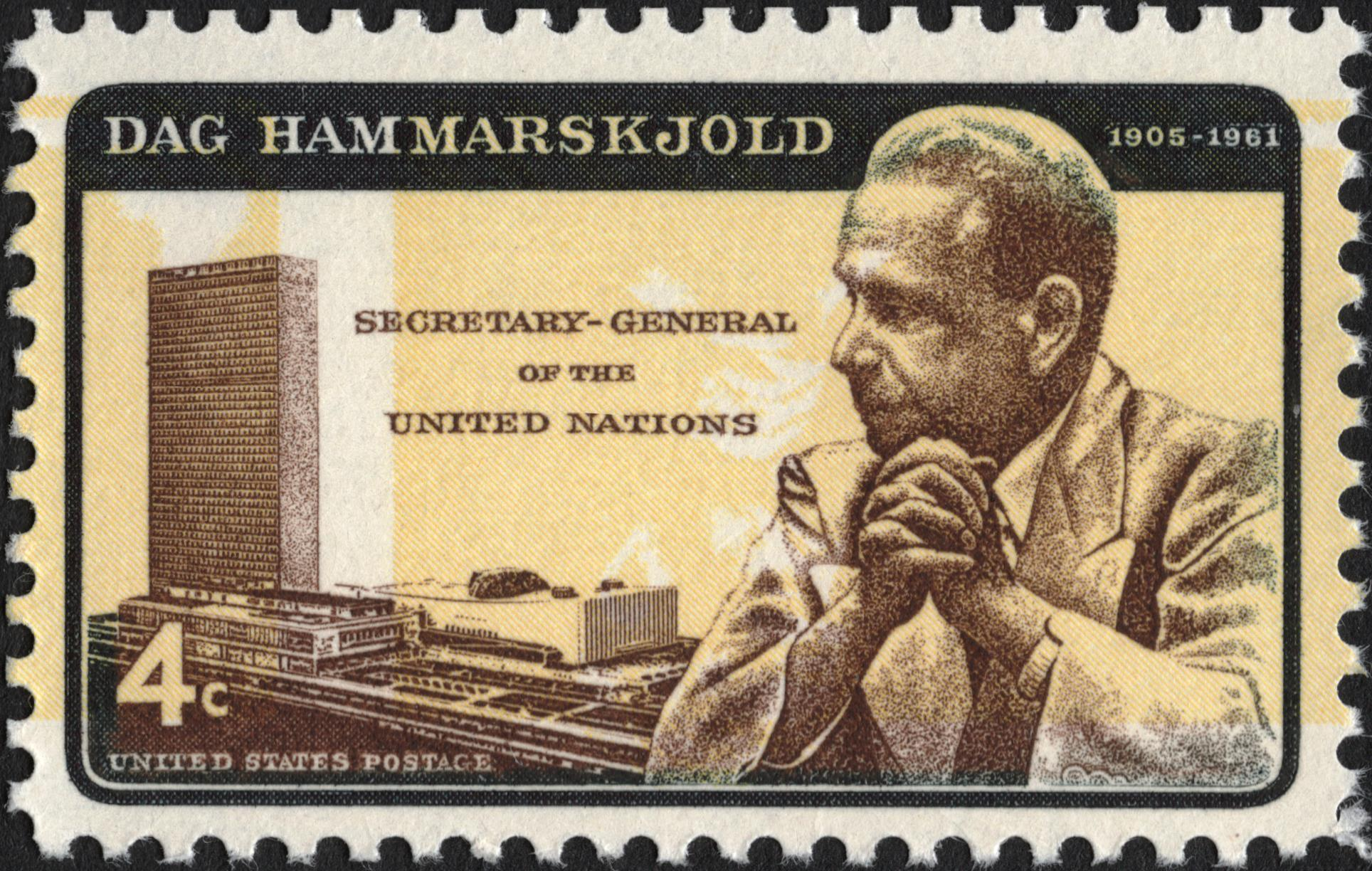
- Country of production: United States
- Date of production: 23 October 1962
- Commemorates: Dag Hammarskjöld
- Nature of rarity: Invert error
- No. in existence: 40,270,000
- Face value: 4 US cents
- Estimated value: US$ 0.50

The Dag Hammarskjöld invert is a 4 cent value postage stamp error issued on 23 October 1962 by the United States Postal Service (then known as the Post Office Department) one year after the death of Dag Hammarskjöld, Secretary-General of the United Nations, in an airplane crash. The stamp, showing the yellow background inverted relative to the image and text, is also known as the Day's Folly after Postmaster General J. Edward Day, who ordered the intentional reprinting of the yellow invert commenting, "The Post Office Department is not running a jackpot operation."

The stamp reprint was in effect a deliberate error produced by the Post Office Department to avoid creating a rarity. It was decided to reprint 40 million of the inverted stamps after the discovery of the error so there would be no rarity factor in the inverted stamp and to prevent people profiting from the Postal Service's mistake. The reprints were issued to the public on 16 November and described as a Special Printing.

The black, brown and yellow commemorative stamp with yellow background correctly printed has a Scott catalogue number of 1203 but the inverted error is numbered 1204. The catalogue value of the invert is worth little more than the normal. The stamp, printed on Giori press in plates of 200, was designed by Herbert Sanborn and engraved by C. A. Brooks. 121,440,000 normal stamps were printed and 40,270,000 of the inverted reprint were produced.

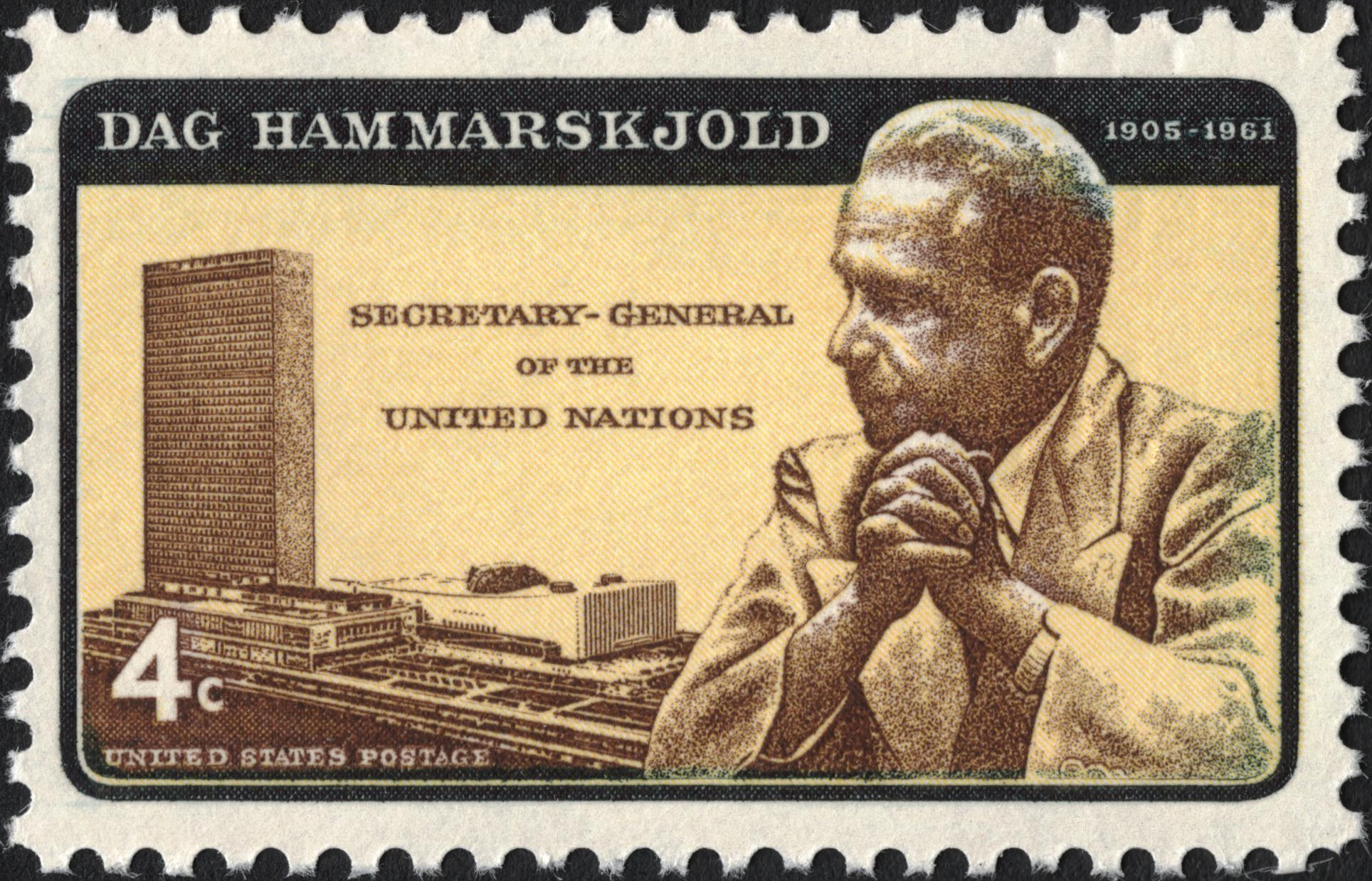
Normal stamp

It has not been recorded how many original invert stamps were produced and it is virtually impossible to tell a reprint from an original unless it has a clear early date, but an invert error on a first day cover, proving that stamp was from the original printing and not from the reprint, was sold in 2005 for US $3,500.

The finder of the discovery sheet, a New Jersey jeweler named Leonard Sherman, obtained a court injunction against the reprinting, but it came too late to stop production. He did however receive an affidavit from the (then) Post Office Department that his was the original sheet. In 1987 Sherman donated his sheet to the American Philatelic Society because the reprint dashed his hopes of owning a valuable stamp error.

Mad magazine later commemorated the affair by printing a parody stamp that looked similar to the real issue, but put a crying Sherman in place of Hammarskjold with money flying away from him.

== See also ==
- Invert error
- List of notable postage stamps
