= Invert error =

Stamp printing error

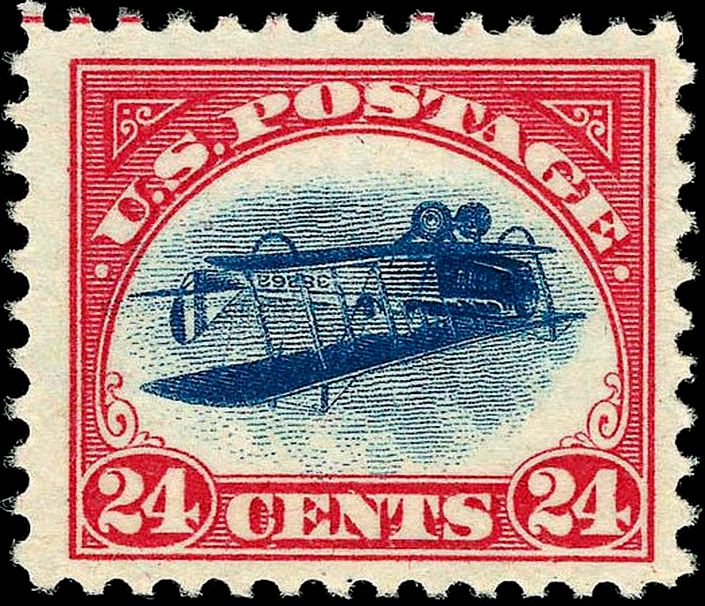
The Inverted Jenny, of which only a single sheet of 100 was ever found

In philately, an invert error occurs when part of a stamp is printed upside-down. Inverts are perhaps the most spectacular of postage stamp errors, not only because of their striking visual appearance, but because some are quite rare, and highly valued by stamp collectors.

== Characteristics ==
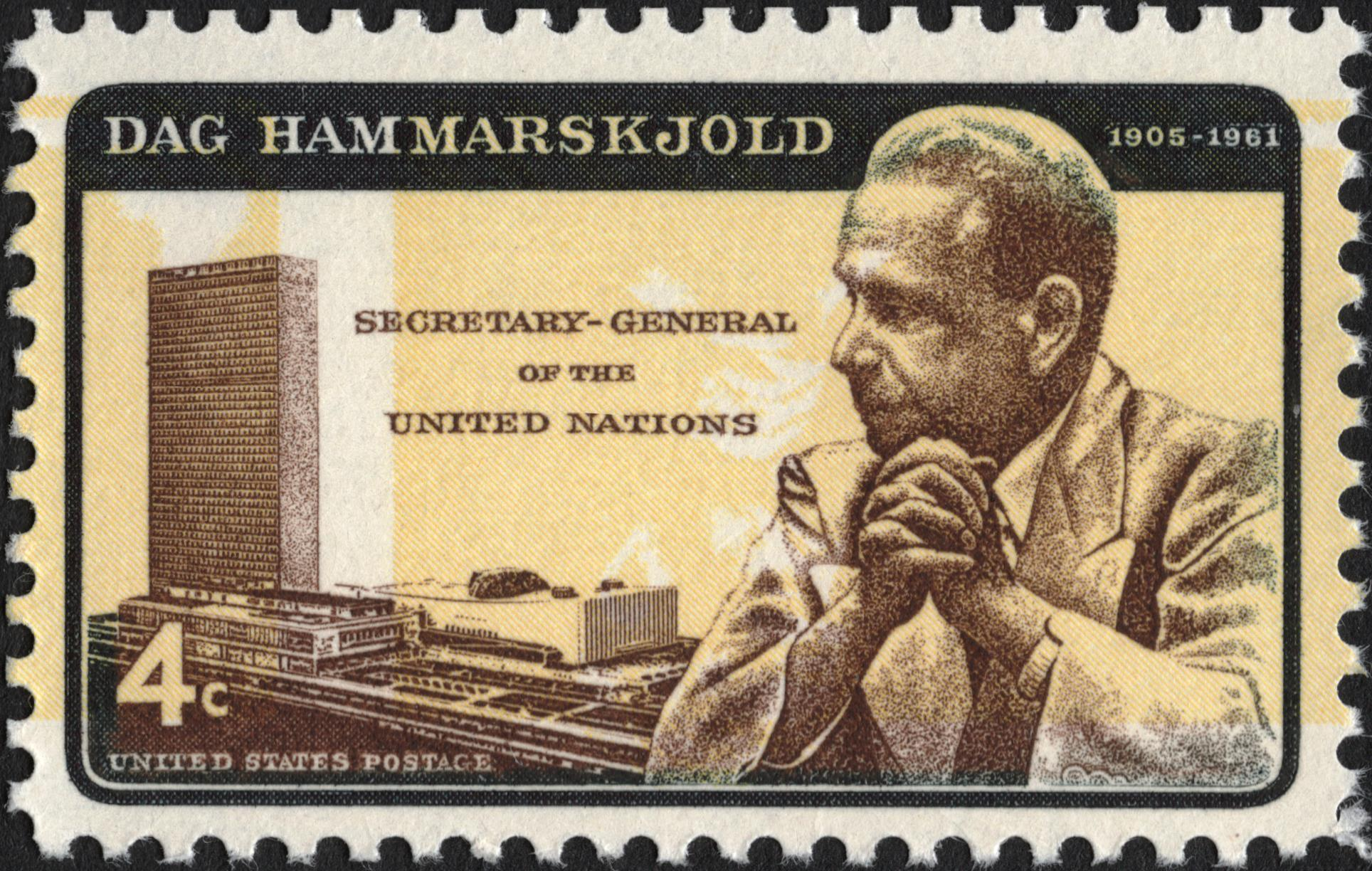
The Dag Hammarskjold invert

Invert errors, or "inverts" for short, most commonly arise when producing multi-colored stamps via multiple passes through the printing press. It is easy for a printing plant worker to insert a half-finished sheet the wrong way around, resulting in the inverts. Such an error being so obvious, nearly all misprinted sheets are caught and destroyed before they leave the plant, and still more are caught during distribution or at the post office before being sold.

A much less common situation is for the invert to be embedded into the printing plate or stone, most famously the case for the Inverted Swan of early Western Australia.

An invert may be characterized as an "inverted center" or "inverted frame" when the underlying paper is watermarked or otherwise carries a basic orientation. It is possible for a single-color stamp to be inverted relative to watermark, but this is called an "inverted watermark" rather than an "inverted stamp". Depending on the positioning of stamps within their sheet, the invert may be perfectly centered (as with the Inverted Jenny), or offset.

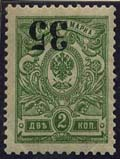
Inverted overprint on a 1919 stamp of Siberia

Not all inverts are spectacular. The Dag Hammarskjöld invert of 1962 consists only of a misprinted yellow layer, and it is not immediately clear that the white area is not a deliberate element of the design. Early Danish post horn issues have an ornate frame that is almost perfectly symmetrical, and an inverted frame can be detected only by minute examination.

Overprints may also be inverted. Many of these are common, since the expedient nature of many overprints means that the production process is not so carefully controlled.

Rare inverts often have significant monetary worth. Inverted Jennies have long sold for over US$100,000 apiece, and the St. Lawrence Seaway inverts of Canada approach those numbers. High prices for inverts have tempted printing company employees to steal misprinted sheets from the printing plant and attempt to pass them off as genuine, as in the 1996 case of the "Nixon invert".

== An inverted invert ==
In 2013 the U. S. Postal Service offered a six-stamp souvenir sheet commemorating the famous Inverted Jenny issue. These stamps replicated the famous upside-down airplane image, but did not duplicate the original 24¢ denomination, instead being valued at $2. To publicize this issue, the Postal Service announced that one hundred sheets bearing six non-inverted Jenny images had also been printed and were being randomly distributed, ensuring that a few fortunate customers who had ordered the normal sheet would instead receive an inverted invert of far greater value. These non-inverts began appearing in public auctions in 2014, fetching high prices.

== Notable inverts ==
=== Australia ===
- Inverted Swan

=== Belgium ===
- Inverted Dendermonde

=== Canada ===
- St. Lawrence Seaway invert (1959)

=== India ===
- Inverted Head 4 Annas (1854)

=== Jamaica ===
- Jamaica 1sh inverted-frame error (1920)

=== Malta ===
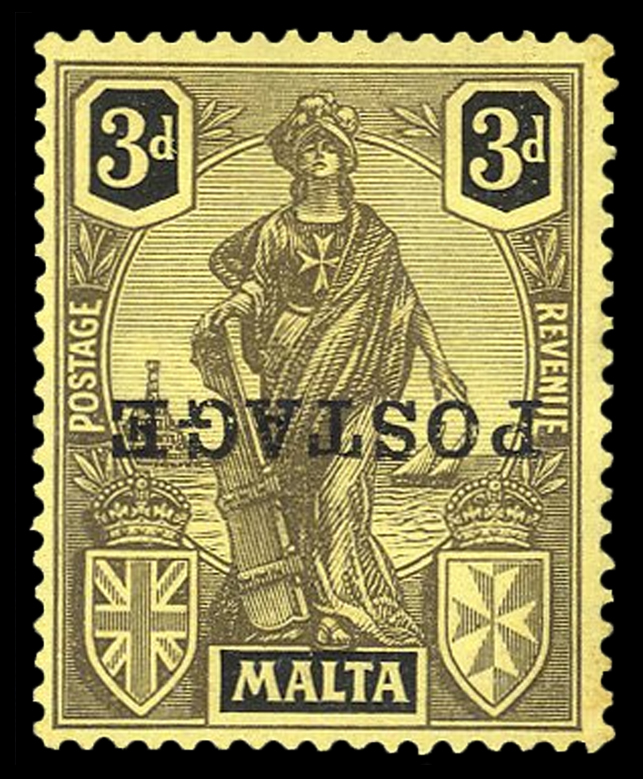
Melita issue 3d with inverted overprint

- Melita issue 3d inverted Postage overprint (1926)

=== New Zealand ===
- 4d Lake Taupo invert (1904)

=== United States ===
- Pictorial Issue inverts (1869)
- Pan-American inverts (1901)
- Inverted Jenny (1918)
- Dag Hammarskjöld invert (1962)
- CIA invert (1976)
- Nixon invert (1996)
