= Angelo Lima =

Philatelist

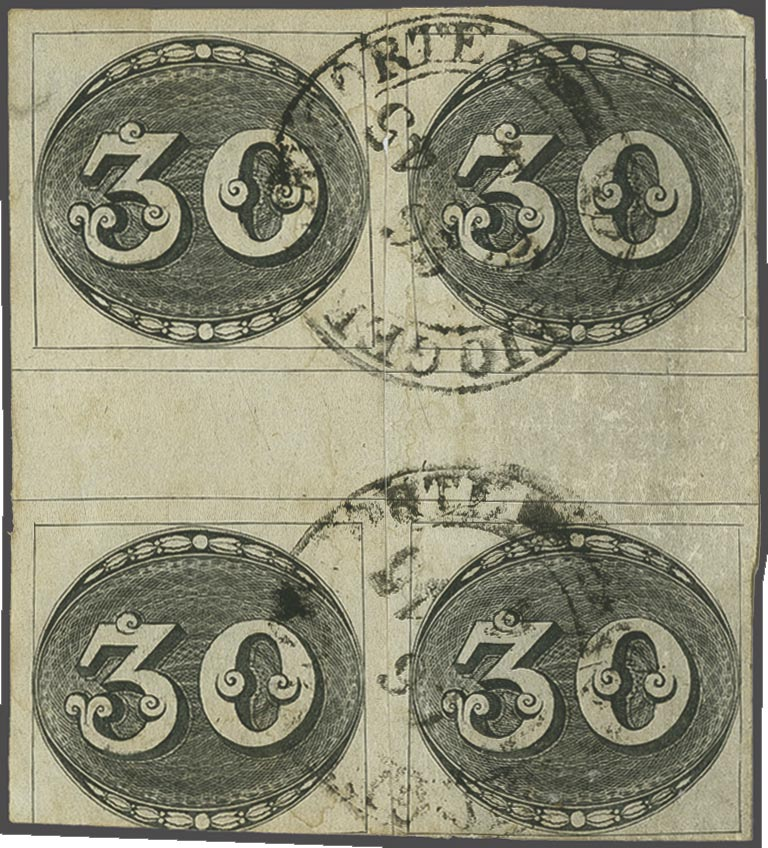
The 30 reis interpane block of Bull's Eyes, used 1845, that Paulo Comelli bought for Angelo Lima in 1987.

Angelo Lima, was a philatelist who was a specialist in the philately of the Portuguese area.

A collector from a young age, Lima patiently built up his collections until they were strong enough to win the top awards in philately. His display Brazil: 1843-1866 won a Large Gold Medal at Stamp World London 1990. Other awards were the International Grand-Prix at PhilexFrance 89 and the Championship Grand Prix at PhilaNippon 91. When his Brazilian collection was sold by David Feldman in 1993, it was described as "clearly the greatest single collection of Brazil ever formed".

Lima's collection of classic Portugal was sold by Afinsa in 1995 and raised 226m pesetas which was a record for a philatelic auction on the Iberian Peninsula.

== See also ==
- Hugo Goeggel
