= List of most expensive philatelic items =

This is a list of the highest known prices paid for philatelic items, including stamps and covers. The current record price for a single stamp is US$9,480,000 paid for the British Guiana 1c magenta.

This list is ordered by consumer price index inflation-adjusted value (in bold) in millions of United States dollars in 2025. (Note: The Wikipedia template uses a yearly average inflation. Using monthly averages gives slightly different numbers, most significantly for items sold early or late in a year with significant inflation.) Where necessary, the price is first converted to dollars using the exchange rate at the time the item was sold. The inflation adjustment may change as recent inflation rates are often revised. A list in another currency may be in a slightly different order due to exchange-rate fluctuations. Individual items are listed only once, i.e. for the highest price sold.

| Adjusted price | Original price | Item(s) | Example image(s) | Country | Year | No. in existence | Date of sale | Seller | Buyer | Auction house | Refs |
|---|---|---|---|---|---|---|---|---|---|---|---|
| $25,500,000 | $17,400,000 | Red Revenue block of four and sheet of 25 5-candarin Large Dragon stamps | | Qing China | 1878 (Large Dragons); 1897 (Red Revenues) | Unknown (Large Dragons); 1 known (Red Revenues block of four); 32 known (Individual Red Revenues) | 2009 | Lam Manyin | Ding Jingsong | Unknown | |
| $13,300,000 | $11,200,000^{*} | "Ball Cover" with Mauritius 1d red (XX) | | British Mauritius | 1847 | 3 known | June 26, 2021 | Anonymous | Anonymous | Christoph Gärtner | |
| $12,893,000 | $9,480,000^{*} | British Guiana 1c magenta | | British Guiana | 1856 | 1 known | June 17, 2014 | Estate of John du Pont | Stuart Weitzman | Sotheby's, New York | |
| $8,915,000 | $4,000,000 | "Bordeaux Cover" with Mauritius 2d blue (XXII) and Mauritius 1d red (XXI) | | British Mauritius | 1847 | Unique | 1993 | Anonymous | Anonymous | David Feldman SA, Geneva | |
| $6,500,000 | $4,800,000 | Inverted Jenny block of four | | United States | 1918 | 1 (as block of four); 100 (as individual stamps) | October 4, 2014 | Donald Sundman | Anonymous | Private sale | |
| $5,570,760 | $5,570,760 | 500 mon Inverted Centre | | Empire of Japan | 1871 | 1 known | June 3, 2023 | Yuji Yamada | Anonymous | David Feldman SA, Geneva | |
| $4,900,000 | $2,970,000 (Note: Value derived from exchange with Inverted Jenny block of four, bought in the same year (2005) for $2,970,000.) | Z Grill | | United States | 1868 | 2 | 2005 | Donald Sundman | Bill H. Gross | Private exchange | |
| $4,722,000 | $2,300,000 (Note: The stamp was sold on May 22, 2010 for an undisclosed price higher than the 1996 price of $2.3 million USD, to Armand Rousso.) | Treskilling Yellow | | Sweden | 1855 | 1 known | 1996 | Anonymous | The Box AB | David Feldman SA, Geneva | |
| $4,015,000 | $1,900,000 | "Missionary cover" with Hawaiian 2c Blue, 5c Blue and two United States 3c Brownish Carmine | | Hawaii and United States | 1852 | Unique | November 7, 1995 | The Honolulu Advertiser Collection | Anonymous | Robert A. Siegel, New York | |
| $3,620,000 | $2,690,000 | "Bombay Cover" with two Mauritius 1d red (XVIII & XIX) | | British Mauritius | 1847 | Unique | 2016 | Anonymous | Anonymous | David Feldman SA, Geneva | |
| $3,130,000 | $2,190,000 | 1/2grano blue "error of colour" | | Two Sicilies | 1859 | 2 | June 10, 2011 | Anonymous | Anonymous | Galerie Dreyfus, Basel | |
| $3,030,000 | $1,900,000 | "Rush 1847 Cover" with strip of six 10c black stamps | | United States | 1847 | Unique | May 13, 2006 | Anonymous | Anonymous | Robert A. Siegel, New York | |
| $2,840,000 | $1,900,000 | "Xiphopagus Triplet" with two 30r and one 60r stamps | | Brazil | 1843 | Unknown | June 5, 2008 | The Islander Collection of South America | Anonymous | Robert A. Siegel, New York | |
| $2,563,000 | $1,150,000 | Mauritius 2d blue (III) | | British Mauritius | 1847 | 12 known | 1993 | Anonymous | Mauritian private consortium | David Feldman SA, Geneva | |
| $2,430,000 | $1,680,000 | "Champion" letter with two 5-centime Strubels in blue misprint and brown 5-centime Strubel | | Switzerland | 1855 | Unique | June 10, 2011 | Anonymous | Anonymous | Galerie Dreyfus, Basel | |
| $2,400,000 | $1,605,000 | "Trondheim" block of 39 4-skilling stamps | | Norway | 1855 | Unique | April 2008 | Anonymous | Anonymous | David Feldman SA, Geneva | |
| $2,600,000 | $2,000,000 | The Whole Country is Red | | People's Republic of China | 1968 | Unknown | November 23, 2018 | Anonymous | Anonymous | China Guardian, Beijing | |
| $2,200,400 | $1,471,500 | Baden 9 Kreuzer error | | Baden | 1851 | 4 | April 3, 2008 | Anonymous | Anonymous | David Feldman SA, Geneva | |
| $2,042,000 | $1,593,000* | Inverted Jenny | | United States | 1918 | 100 | November 15, 2018 | Anonymous | Anonymous | Robert A. Siegel, New York | |
| $1,923,810 | $1,344,180 | Mauritius 2d blue (XIII) | | British Mauritius | 1847 | 12 known | June 28, 2011 | The Chartwell Collection of Humphrey Cripps | Anonymous | Spink, London | |
| $1,536,180 | $1,073,340 | Mauritius 1d red (X) | | British Mauritius | 1847 | 15 known | 1993 | Anonymous | Mauritian private consortium | David Feldman SA, Geneva | |
| $1,490,000 | $1,180,000 | Alexandria "Blue Boy" cover | | United States | 1847 | Unique | June 22, 2019 | Anonymous | Anonymous | H.R. Harmer, New York | |
| $1,346,000 | $900,000 | B Grill | | United States | 1867-8 | 4 known | October 28, 2008 | The Perry Hansen Collection of U.S. Stamps and Covers | Anonymous | Robert A. Siegel, New York | |
| $1,341,000 | $970,000 | Red Revenue | | Qing China | 1897 | 32 known | 2013 | Anonymous | Anonymous | Interasia Auctions, Hong Kong | |
| $1,270,000 | $600,000 | 2-cent unused Hawaii "Missionaries" stamp | | Hawaii | 1851 | 1 (unused); 15 (total) | November 7, 1995 | The Honolulu Advertiser Collection | Anonymous | Robert A. Siegel, New York | |

^{*} Buyer's premium included

== See also ==
- List of postage stamps
