= Armand Rousso =

French businessman and felon

Marc Armand Rousso is a French author and businessman. He founded the business-to-business search engine Accoona as well as X3D Technology.

In 1999, Rousso was arrested on charges of money laundering, and securities fraud.

Rousso is the father of Vanessa Rousso, a professional poker player and former Big Brother contestant.

== Biography ==
Rousso settled in the United States in 1982, working as a trader of stamps. In 1985, he stated that he had bartered $45 million (catalog value) in rare postage stamps.

In 1986, Rousso started an online stamp exchange website, The International Stamp Exchange, which lasted until 1990. The International Stamp Exchange was part of a network run by David N. Glassman, who created NaicoNet, an early online retail stock trading system. Rousso stated that online advertising revenue could support a business dedicated to philatelists. Rousso and the ISE were profiled in the March 28, 1988, issue of New York Magazine.

Rousso was identified as a buyer of the Treskilling Yellow a Swedish postage stamp printed in the wrong color, at a 2010 auction. The stamp had been auctioned on 22 May 2010, by David Feldman in Geneva, Switzerland, for at least $2.3 million, reported at the time as a record price for a stamp at auction. In May 2013 the stamp was acquired in a private sale by Count Gustaf Douglas, a Swedish nobleman and politician.

In January of 1999, Marc Rousso was arrested for money laundering and securities fraud for defrauding millions of dollars from investors. Rousso later entered into plea agreements with the federal government after spending approximately one year in jail.

=== Accoona search engine ===
Accoona's main product was a search engine described as using artificial intelligence to better interpret search queries. On June 23, 2005, in the ABC Times Square Studios, the Accoona Toolbar, using a prototype based on Fritz 9, played against chess grandmaster Rustam Kasimdzhanov in a demonstration match. The service also included business profile searches and a feature called "SuperTarget". Armand Rousso was the founder of Accoona.

Launched in 2004 with former U.S. president Bill Clinton as its chief spokesperson for its launch, the company failed to gain a significant share of the search engine market. Clinton reportedly made $700,000 for his Clinton Foundation in 2006 from selling Accoona stock. The initial $80.5 million offering was underwritten by Maxim Group. However, as The New York Times reported, "Accoona.com attracted only 106,000 visitors from the United States in July (2007), according to comScore, which monitors Internet traffic." The underwriter withdrew. In 2008, the company was acquired by Masterseek.

== Chess ==
Rousso has been involved in international chess and, through his company X3D Technologies, which develops 3D technology for the internet, sponsored several World Championship matches, including Garry Kasparov vs Anatoly Karpov (2002) and Garry Kasparov vs X3D Fritz (2003).
