= Paulo Comelli =

Paulo Comelli may refer to:

- Paulo Comelli (philatelist) (1943–2011), Brazilian philatelist
- Paulo Comelli (footballer) (born 1960), Brazilian football manager and former footballer
