= Baden 9 Kreuzer error =

German postage stamp type with a rare color misprint

9 Kreuzer Cyan
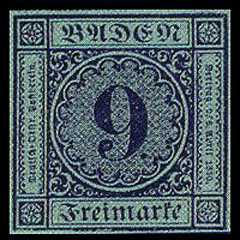
- Country of production: Baden
- Date of production: 1851
- Nature of rarity: Colour error
- No. in existence: 4
- Face value: 9-Kreuzer (= 0.15 Baden gulden)
- Estimated value: €1,314,500

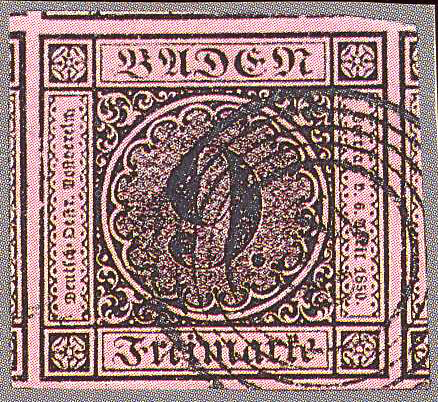
The correct version of the stamp, in pink.

The Baden 9 Kreuzer Error (German: Baden-Fehldruck 9 Kreuzer) is a postage stamp error produced by the historical German state of Baden in 1851.

Baden's first postage stamps were issued on 1 May 1851. The "9 Kreuzer Green" stamp was a color misprint of the 9 Kreuzer denomination that was printed in green instead of pink. The green color was intended for the 6 Kreuzer value, but apparently, the paper sheets were mismatched. Only three cancelled copies and one unused copy of this error are known, but more sheets of paper may have been printed. The cancellations recorded have the numbers "4" for Achern, "41" for Ettenheim, and "106" for Orschweier (today Mahlberg). Two of the known copies are on letters.

== Copies ==
The error is one of the greatest philatelic rarities in the world. The 9 Kreuzer error was not discovered until 44 years after the stamp was issued. Two letters initially were in the collection of Baron von Türckheim.

1. The first copy was cancelled on July 20, 1851, in Orschweier; von Türckheim sold this letter to the German Reichspostmuseum. Today, it is one of the key items on display in the Museum of Post and Communication in Berlin.
2. The second copy was cancelled on August 25, 1851, in Ettenheim. This letter found its way into the collection of Philipp von Ferrary, which was auctioned off in the 1920s. It was bought by Alfred Maier and afterwards sold through Edward Stern of Economist Stamp Company to Alfred Caspary. In 1956, it was bought by John R. Boker, who sold it in 1985 for the enormous price of 2,645,000 DM, which at that time was the highest price ever paid for a single stamp.
3. The third copy is on a piece and was cancelled in Achern. In 1908 it was auctioned by Gilbert & Koch; in 1919 it was sold to Théodore Champion, a Parisian stamp dealer.
4. The only unused copy, with nearly full original gum, appeared in 1919 for the first time, when it was sold in Berlin to Carl Julius Trübsbach from Chemnitz. It is believed that the colour was lightened as the result of heat damage during World War II. After the war, Trübsbach sold it to a German dealer. In 1991 it was first auctioned by David Feldman and in 1997 it was auctioned again and was sold for 603,750 US$. On April 3, 2008 it was again auctioned by David Feldman for €1,314,500.

The usual explanation for the occurrence of this error is that the printing plate was accidentally inverted; however, this theory cannot be correct because the stamp was produced in a single printing. It must be assumed that the printer had unintentionally used the wrong plate for the green paper: instead of a "9" he had read a "6".

== See also ==
- List of most expensive philatelic items
- Postage stamps and postal history of Baden
