= Million Dollar Challenge =

The Million Dollar Challenge may refer to:

- The Nedbank Golf Challenge, an annual golf tournament
- The One Million Dollar Paranormal Challenge administered by the James Randi Educational Foundation to demonstrate psychic ability
- Million Dollar Challenge (TV program), an American poker television show
- The Thermal Club IndyCar Grand Prix, an IndyCar Series race initially called the $1 Million Challenge
  - 2024 $1 Million Challenge, the first running of the above race, when it was known as the $1 Million Challenge
