= Hugo Goeggel =

Swiss rower, businessman and philatelist

- Born: 11 November 1936 (age 89); Quito, Ecuador
- Education: ETH Zurich
- Occupation: Businessman

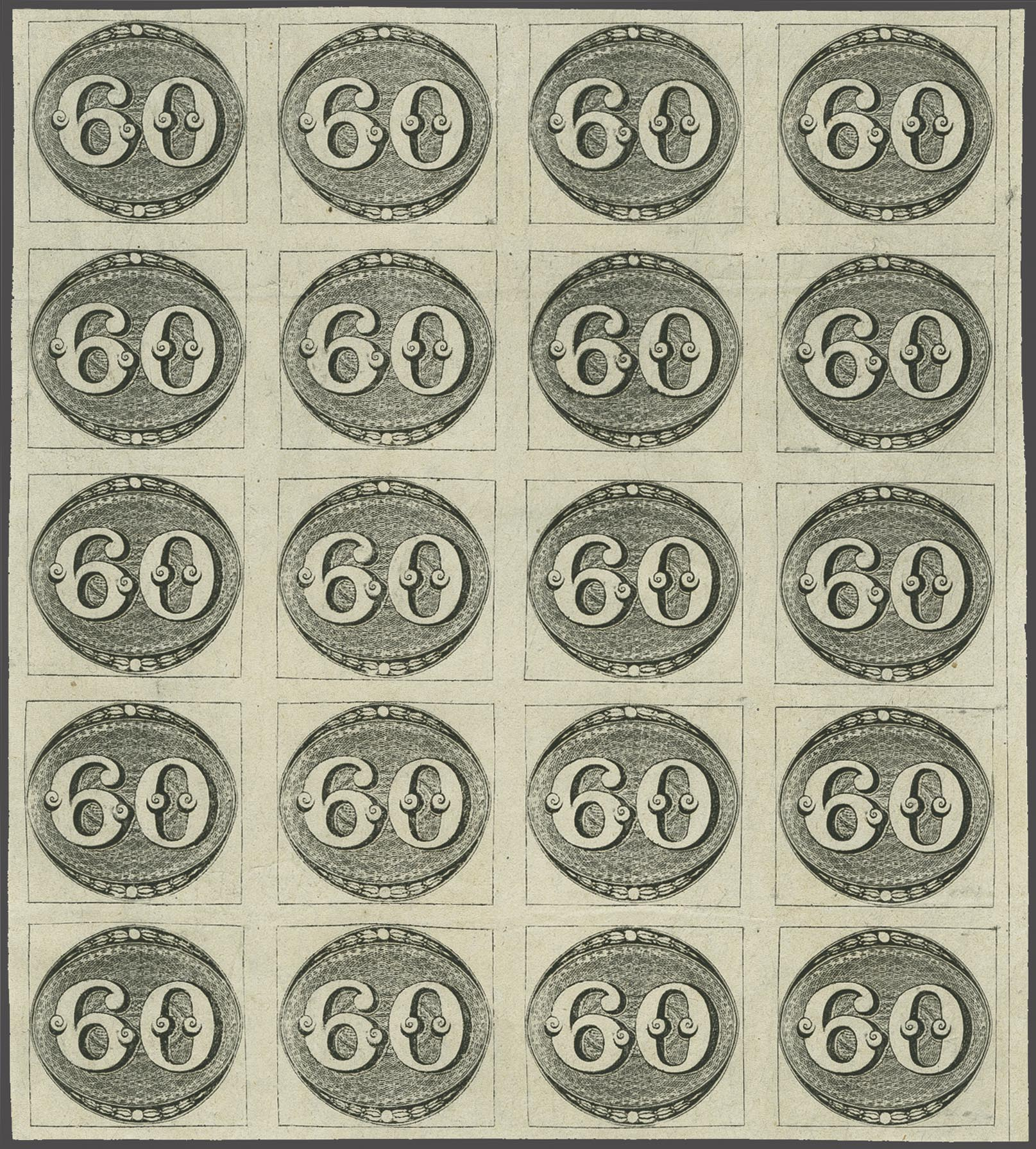
A large block of 1843 Brazilian 60 reis "Bull's Eye" stamps from the Goeggel collection. First plate, State B, mint.

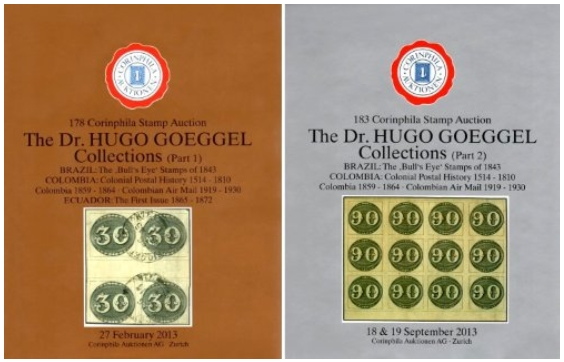
The Corinphila auction catalogues from 2013.

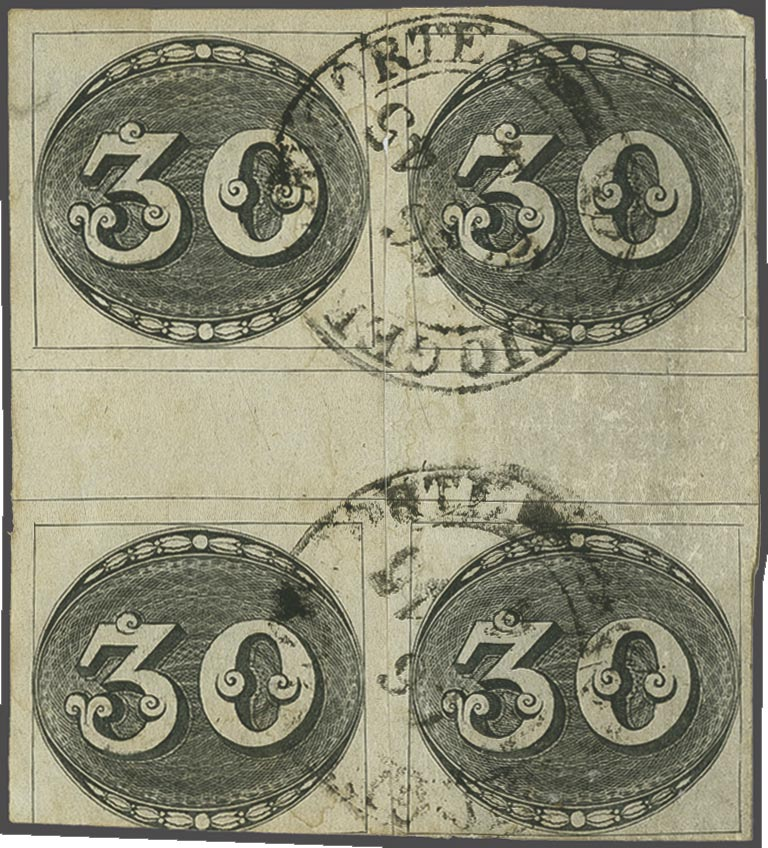
The 30 reis interpane block, used 1845. Sold by Corinphila in 2013 for CHF 360,000.

Hugo Goeggel (born Quito, Ecuador, 11 November 1936) is a Swiss businessman and philatelist, resident in Colombia, who signed the Roll of Distinguished Philatelists in 2010.

== Early life and family ==
Goeggel was born in Quito, Ecuador, in 1936, the eldest son of Swiss couple who emigrated to that country in 1936 prior to the start of World War II. In 1945 the family moved to Colombia. Goeggel's father was a cheese maker who was able to establish a successful business making varieties of Swiss cheese to sell to the many European migrants in Colombia. In Sopó, near Bogota, the climate was suitable for the production of milk by highland farmers similar to that of Europe north of the Alps. The firm, Alpina, became one of the largest food companies in Colombia with a turnover of about US $700m annually. Hugo is the brother of Erwin Goggel executive producer of "La Vendedora de Rosas" nominated for the Palme d'Or at Cannes.

== Education and rowing ==
Goeggel's early education was local but at age 12 he was sent to Switzerland where he was under the tutelage of Hans Brodbeck who introduced him to rowing and serious philately. He joined the Ruderclub Reuss Lucerne Rowing Club and was part of a successful team nicknamed "Lecco Blitz" that won many races in the late 1950s. He rowed for Switzerland at the 1960 Rome Olympics in the men's eight.

After military service Goeggel studied Chemistry at the Federal Polytechnic Institute in Zurich, graduating in 1962. In 1967 he received his Doctorate from the same institution.

== Business career ==
Goeggel returned to Colombia after completing his Doctorate and worked his way up through various family-owned food businesses, expanding and improving the range of products. He is a Director of Alpina, which is one third owned by the Goeggel family.

== Philately ==
Goeggel is an expert in the philately of South America. He has won gold medals for his displays of Colombia: Pre-adhesive, Classic Brazil - The First Issue of 1843, Classic Ecuador: the first issue 1865/72 and Colombia, Colonial Postal History. Other exhibits include Classic Colombia - The First four Issues 1859-1862 and Colombia - Development of air mail (1919-1928). He has written on the plate characteristics and papers of early Colombian stamps. His collection Brazil, the Bull's Eyes 1843 won him Championship Class awards.

In 2013, Corinphila auctions sold items from Goeggel's gold medal-winning collections of Brazil, Colombia and Ecuador over two sales on 27 February and 18/19 September respectively. The sales included one of the most important collections of the "Bull's Eye" stamps of Brazil ever formed. The lots included the mint 60 reis block of twenty, the second largest multiple of this stamp known, and hundreds of other examples of mint and used stamps and stamps on cover. The sale of the Bull's Eyes in Part 1 alone, raised over CHF 1.3 million including buyer's premium (over US$ 1M). A further sale of Colombia took place on 20 May 2014.

The key item of Brazil was the 30 reis interpane Bull's Eye block of four which sold for CHF 360,000 including buyer's premium. It was discovered by Luiz Figueiredo Filho only in 1950 who bought it at Coda Philatelic House in Rio de Janeiro. The block, used 1845, proved the existence of a third plate for the stamp as theorised by George Napier (died 1942) and is the only surviving example of an interpane 30 reis. From Filho it then passed into the collection of Niso Vianna who exhibited it in award-winning collections in the 1950s and 60s. It was then owned by Reynaldo Bruno Pracchia who exhibited it throughout the 1970s and included it in his Championship Class Grand Prix winning exhibit at London 1980. He sold it in 1986 to the David Feldman firm along with other items and in 1987 it was bought at a Feldman auction by Paulo Comelli for Angelo Lima who also won awards with it. The piece was eventually acquired by Hugo Goeggel in 1995.

== Organised philately ==
Goeggel has been President of the Inter-American Philatelic Federation (1997-2008) and of the Colombian Philatelic Federation. He is a former member of the Council of Philatelists of the National Postal Museum, a joint venture between the Smithsonian Institution and the United States Postal Service.
