= Alexandria "Blue Boy" Postmaster's Provisional =

Rare American postage stamp

Alexandria "Blue Boy"
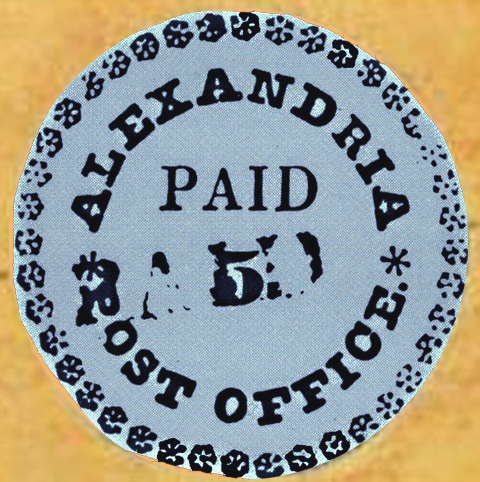
- Alexandria "Blue Boy" stamp
- Country of production: United States of America
- Location of production: Alexandria County, District of Columbia
- Date of production: 1847
- Nature of rarity: Unique
- No. in existence: One
- Face value: 5 cents
- Estimated value: $1,000,000 (in 1981)

The Alexandria "Blue Boy" is a rare Postmasters' Provisionals stamp produced in Alexandria, Virginia (then part of the District of Columbia) in 1847. There are seven known examples of Alexandria provisionals, however, the Blue Boy is the only specimen printed on blue paper. The other six are printed on buff paper. The Blue Boy remains affixed to its original envelope, and sold for $1.18 million in 2019, which is among the highest known prices paid for a philatelic item.

== Background ==
The Act of March 3, 1845, Ch 43, 2 Stat. 732 standardized postal rates in the United States. However, Congress failed to authorize the United States Post office to issue postage stamps to pre-pay these rates. In response, local postmasters in eleven municipalities issued their own stamps between 1845 and 1847. These stamps are known as Postmasters' Provisionals.

Although the use of provisional stamps was officially prohibited after the introduction of a national stamp system on July 1, 1847, it continued sporadically, as in the case of the Blue Boy.

During the Alexandria provisionals' period of use, the city was in the process of being retroceded from the District of Columbia to the commonwealth of Virginia, a process finalized on March 13, 1847.

== Production ==
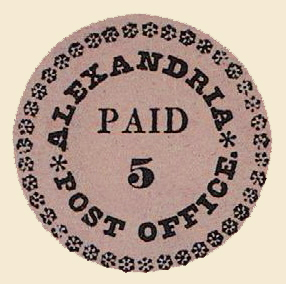
Type II (39 rosettes instead of the 40 on the "Blue Boy").

The Alexandria provisionals were issued under the guidance of the city's postmaster, Daniel Bryan. The stamps were likely printed with equipment from The Alexandria Gazette, the local newspaper.

The provisionals were printed in pairs from a typeset form that produced two not-quite-identical images, classified by philatelic experts as Type I and Type II. The Blue Boy is one of the four surviving Type I stamps; only three Type II examples are known. Both types conform to same general circular design, which presents an outer rim of rosettes surrounding a smaller ring of text: "ALEXANDRIA "* POST OFFICE. *"; and, at the stamp’s center, the horizontal word "PAID" with the numeral "5" below it. However, while Type I has forty rosettes, only thirty-nine appear on Type II—which, moreover, differs from Type I in its spacing of letters and asterisks. The provisionals' two-at-a-time production indicates that at least one Type II Blue Boy must have once existed.

== The cover ==
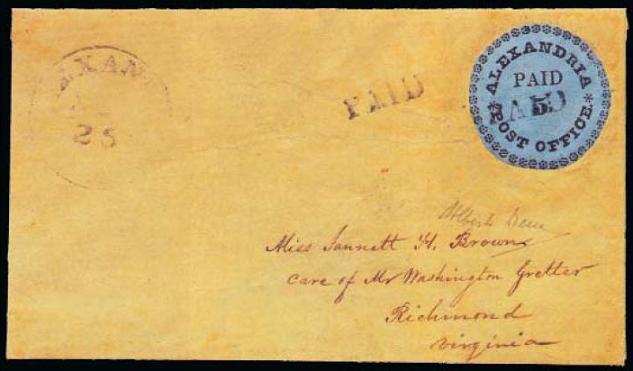
The Alexandria "Blue Boy" cover

There is only one known specimen of the Alexandria "Blue Boy." It remains attached to the envelope on which it was originally mailed, canceled with a "PAID" handstamp. The envelope is addressed to Jannett Hooff Brown and was sent by her second cousin James Wallace Hooff on November 24, 1847. Hoof was secretly courting Brown and, at the bottom of the letter, had instructed her to “Burn as usual.” The pair eventually married and had three children.

The stamp was rediscovered by the pair's daughter in 1907. That same year, notable collector George H. Worthington reportedly acquired the envelope for $3,000. The letter remained among the family papers. Since then, the cover has changed hands several times, and its owners have included Alfred H. Caspary and Josiah K. Lilly, Jr.

In 1981, a private collector acquired the cover through the philatelic auctioneer David Feldman for one million dollars, a record at the time.

In the 2013 Scott catalogue listing of the Blue Boy, a dash appears in the value column instead of a number: an indication that "information is lacking or insufficient for establishing a usable catalogue value."

The cover's last recorded sale took place in 2019. It was auctioned through H.R. Harmer and fetched $1.18 million.

Given that the Blue Boy was a provisional and local—rather than regular and national—issue, there is room for disagreement over whether it fully merits placement in the elite category of one-of-a-kind stamps alongside the Treskilling Yellow of Sweden and the British Guiana one cent magenta.

== Trivia ==
On September 3, 2026, Deutsche Post issued a special stamp for "Tag der Briefmarke" ("Stamp Day") featuring the Alexandria "Blue Boy" as its motif.

== See also ==
- List of most expensive philatelic items
- List of notable postage stamps
- US provisional issue stamps
- A Gallery of U. S. Postmasters' Provisional Stamps, 1845-47
