= Vanessa Rousso =

American poker player (born 1983)

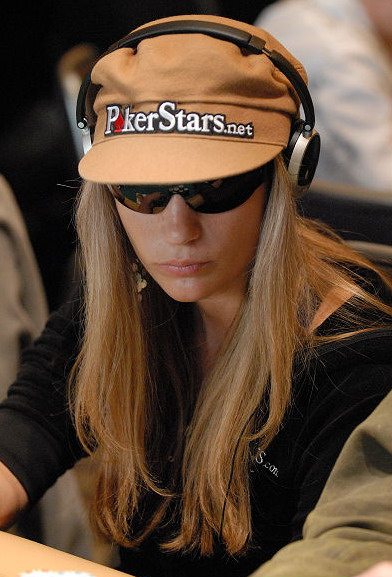
- Rousso in the World Poker Tour Championship event (2007)
- Nicknames: Pokerness; Lady Maverick
- Born: February 5, 1983 (age 43); White Plains, New York, U.S.

World Series of Poker
- Bracelet: None
- Money finishes: 17
- Highest WSOP Main Event finish: 511th, 2011

World Poker Tour
- Title: None
- Final table: 1
- Money finishes: 7

European Poker Tour
- Title: None
- Final table: None
- Money finish: 1

Vanessa Ashley Rousso (born February 5, 1983) is an American professional poker player, attorney, DJ, and television personality. Rousso was a member of Team PokerStars from 2006 to 2015, with the online name Lady Maverick, and was a spokesman for GoDaddy.com from 2009 to 2013. She has earned money as a professional poker player since 2005.

Between 2005 and 2011, Rousso finished in the money in numerous live poker events and accumulated nearly $3.5 million, but has been less active since, earning just $83,000 in live tournaments between 2012 and 2017. She has placed in the money seventeen times at the World Series of Poker. In 2007, she won over $700,000 with a second-place finish in the main event of the World Championship of Online Poker. As of September 2021, having not cashed at a tournament since 2017, Rousso still ranks among the top ten women in poker history in terms of all-time money winnings.

Rousso has been a pro-gambling campaigner and activist. She has appeared on television in several cash or charity poker competitions, and finished in third place as a contestant on the 2015 season of Big Brother.

== Early life, family and education ==
Rousso was born in White Plains, New York to Marc Armand Rousso and Cynthia Bradley of Hobe Sound, Florida. Rousso began talking and reading at early ages says her mother, Cynthia Ferrara. She and her family moved to France when she was three years old. She lived in Paris, in her father's homeland until she was 10, when she moved briefly to Upstate New York. Rousso holds dual citizenship with the United States and France. After her parents divorced in 1992, her mother moved Vanessa to Florida to be near her maternal grandparents. Rousso attended Wellington Landings Middle School.

Rousso was active on the high-school swimming, lacrosse and debating teams. She also played softball and basketball for fun. In debating, Rousso excelled in national debating tournaments in policy debating. Her mother is a guidance counselor at Jupiter Community High School. In 2001, Rousso graduated as valedictorian of her high school in Wellington, Florida. She maintained a 4.0 GPA at Wellington High School while participating in the National Honor Society, and French Honor Society. She founded the Environmental Club and served as its president. She was also active as a violinist, varsity swimmer, and volunteer for Mothers Against Drunk Drivers. Rousso has two younger sisters: Tiffany, a high school teacher and contestant on the 18th season of American Big Brother, and Leticia, an optometrist.

In college, she was on the Dean's list. After studying some game theory, she became proficient with the Rubik's Cube and then chess. However, because she considers both to be fairly objective static games, she began to prefer poker, which incorporated human psychology that allows for inferior hands to win. She graduated early from Duke University after two and a half years with a major in economics and a minor in political science in December 2003. Her collegiate duration of two and a half years was the shortest time to graduate in the history of Duke. Rousso began law school in 2004 and was the inaugural recipient of the Chaplin Scholarship from the University of Miami School of Law. During school she served on the editorial board of the University of Miami Law Review. In 2018 she enrolled in order to finish law school, which she completed that same year. Soon after graduating, she passed the Florida Bar Exam.

A poker player since the age of five, Rousso began serious poker tournament play during her summer break from law school. Rousso did not initially finish law school, dropping out to pursue her burgeoning poker career instead. However, she returned to school in the fall of 2017, and graduated magna cum laude in the Spring of 2018.

== Poker career ==
As of September 2021, excluding online winnings, and having not cashed at a tournament since 2017, she ranked as number eight among women players in terms of all-time money winnings.

Rousso built her first stake at Hard Rock sit & go ten-player tables, where first prize was $250. From there, she was able to save for a $1,500 entry fee in Atlantic City in late 2005, which she parlayed into $17,500. This enabled her to afford entry into the World Poker Tour event at the Bellagio in Vegas. She has been televised numerous times on both ESPN and the Travel Channel (among others). She has made several appearances on the Poker After Dark television program. Rousso has also been televised as part of the World Poker Tour. She is known for wearing a cap, headphones and designer sunglasses.

Her first win in a professional event came on June 13, 2005, in Las Vegas, Nevada, during the No-Limit Hold'em Summer Series. At the 2005 World Series of Poker, she placed 45th in a field of 601 in the Event 26, $1,000 Ladies No-Limit Texas hold 'em event, won by Jennifer Tilly on June 26.

On February 12, 2006, Rousso placed fifth at the final table of the 195-entrant $1,500 No-Limit Hold'em WSOP Circuit event at Harrah's Atlantic City.

Rousso joined the professional poker tour in April 2006, and by October was among the top 80 in earnings that year. In her first year of playing, Rousso had multiple in the money tournament finishes, including a seventh-place finish in a field of 605 at the $25,000 April 26, 2006 World Poker Tour (Season four) No-Limit Hold'em championship event, in which she earned $263,625 in prize money. By that time she was spending Tuesday through Thursday taking her law school classes, spending the rest of the week playing in poker tournaments and fielding endorsement offers from online poker clubs. On September 13, 2006, she won $285,450 with a first-place finish at the 173-entrant $5,000 no-limit hold 'em event at the 4th Borgata Open. At 2006 World Series of Poker she had three in the money finishes. She finished 80th in a field of 1068 in Event 4, $1,500 Limit Hold'em, 63rd in a field of 824 in Event 5, $2500 Short Handed No-Limit Hold'em, and she placed 8th of 507 in the Event 30, $5000 Short Handed No-Limit Hold'em event.

By 2007, Rousso was a notable poker star. In October 2007, Rousso was part of a contingent of poker industry representatives and leaders of the 800,000-member Poker Players Alliance who flew to Washington, D.C., to attempt to convince the United States Congress to overturn the 2006 Unlawful Internet Gambling Enforcement Act. The law compels financial institutions to monitor and stop their customers' cash transfers to unlawful online gaming sites. The group met with both the United States House Committee on the Judiciary and the United States House Committee on Financial Services. She spoke in favor of a proposal by Barney Frank to license and regulate online gambling. The alliance also spoke in favor of the Skill Game Protection Act proposed by Robert Wexler to exempt poker, mah-jongg, chess, bridge and other games where contestants compete against each other rather than the "house" from the Unlawful Internet Gambling Enforcement Act. In May 2009, Frank, who had become the chairman of the House Committee on Financial Services in 2007, continued his efforts to "establish a framework to allow licensed gambling operators to process bets from players in the United States," with the support of the Poker Players Alliance and Harrah's Entertainment among others.

In 2007, she earned $700,782.50, her largest career payday at that time, during the World Championship of Online Poker NL Hold'em Main Event with a second-place finish in the 2998-entrant field. She had originally placed third in the event, but the winner was found to have violated the Pokerstars terms of service, which caused a disqualification ruling and caused all contestants to be elevated one place in the rankings. The tournament is run online by Rousso's sponsor, PokerStars, and she had originally earned the third place prize of $463,940.50. At 2008 World Series of Poker she again had three in the money finishes. She placed 57 of 605 in Event 38, $2000 Pot Limit Hold'em, placed 44 of 2693 in Event 52, $1500 No-Limit Hold'em, and 625 of 6844 in the Main event 54, $10,000 No-Limit Hold'em.

In January 2009, Rousso just missed the televised six-handed WPT final table while playing at the World Poker Tour Season VII Southern Poker Championship; she finished in seventh place and earned $79,117. In the head-to-head single-elimination 2009 National Heads-Up Poker Championship tournament, Rousso made it to the finals of the 64-person field before losing to Huck Seed. Along the way to her runner-up finish, she defeated Doyle Brunson, Phil Ivey, Paul Wasicka, Daniel Negreanu, and Bertrand Grospellier. Previously, Shannon Elizabeth's 2007 semi-final appearance had been the best female finish in the annual event. The March 6–8 tournament was broadcast on NBC over six consecutive Sundays from April 12 – May 17, 2009. As of July 2011, her tournament winnings exceed $3,100,000. In May 2009, Rousso won the 79-entrant €25,000 EPT High Roller Championship, which had a first prize of 720,000 Euros. However, at the final table, the three final contestants elected to chop chips at €420,000 and leave €150,000 for the winner. The €570,000 win, which converts to $749,467, represents the highest payday of her career. The win propelled Rousso to sixteenth place on the 2009 earnings list as of May 5.

In 2009, Rousso spoke in favor of changes to Florida gambling laws that would remove caps on buy-ins and wagers on poker in the state. She felt the gambling limitations precluded more strategic and skillful deeper-stack competition and said that Florida gamblers "don't have enough chips in front of them to play out the bets and raises that are required in the skillful aspect of the game". In 2007, a $100 cap replaced a $2/bet limit. This cap still prohibits large tournaments with multi-thousand dollar buy-ins from occurring in Florida.

Rousso had her own April 2009 poker instructional camp in South Florida. The camp related poker-playing and strategies to the strategies of military conflict in Sun Tzu's book, The Art of War. She called her camp "Big Slick boot camp" and charged a $399 participation fee. The camp's website makes the analogy of the Art of War and the Art of Poker.

At the 2009 World Series of Poker, she had four in-the-money finishes: She placed 27 of 201 in Event 2, $40,000 No-Limit Hold'em; placed 17 of 147 in Event 8, $2500 No-Limit 2-7 Draw Lowball; placed 19 of 770 in Event 31, $1,500 H.O.R.S.E.; and 15 of 275 in the Event 45, $10,000 World Championship Pot-Limit Hold'em. In the main event, she busted out on day 6 (officially known as day 2B). Rousso will be hosting Stars of Poker in France. On January 9, 2010, she finished first among 91 entrants to earn $24,725 at the $1,000 No-Limit Hold'em – Ladies Event at the PokerStars Caribbean Adventure.

At the 2010 World Series of Poker, she has had two in-the-money finishes: She placed 421 of 4345 in Event 3, $1,000 No-Limit Hold'em, and was eliminated in the quarter-final round of 256 entries, earning $92,580 in the $10,000 Heads-Up No-Limit Hold'em Championship. On December 8, 2010, she finished 3rd in a field of 438 at the $10,000 World Poker Tour No-Limit Hold'em Doyle Brunson Five Diamond World Poker Classic (which was won by Antonio Esfandiari), earning $358,964.

=== World Series of Poker ===
World Series of Poker results
| Year | Cashes | Final Tables | Bracelets |
|---|---|---|---|
| 2005 | 1 | | 0 |
| 2006 | 3 | | 0 |
| 2008 | 3 | | 0 |
| 2009 | 4 | | 0 |
| 2010 | 2 | | 0 |
| 2011 | 1 | | 0 |
| 2013 | 1 | | 0 |
| 2015 | 1 | | 0 |
| 2016 | 1 | | 0 |

In addition, Rousso had one cash at the 2014 World Series of Poker Asia Pacific event, and five cashes in various events on the World Series of Poker Circuit tournaments held annually as a build-up to the main World Series of Poker.

== Endorsements ==
Rousso was formerly sponsored by the PokerStars online poker cardroom under the screenname LadyMaverick as part of their Team PokerStars. Her sponsorship with PokerStars ended in February 2015.

Pokerstars approached Sports Illustrated about including a poker player in their 2009 Swimsuit edition. In her online blog on January 4, 2009, Rousso confirmed that she participated that week in a photo shoot in Nassau, Bahamas, when she was there for the PokerStars Caribbean Adventure poker tournament. Rousso appeared in an advertising feature paid for by PokerStars, rather than the swimsuit article itself, in the February 10, 2009, swimsuit issue. In the advertisement, Russo appeared in a bikini bottom and cutoff wetsuit top, in keeping with the swimsuit theme. Rousso's thoughts on the Sports Illustrated publicity was that "It was a great opportunity for poker in general and for me in particular."

In March 2009, Rousso signed to promote internet domain names by GoDaddy, a sponsor of the 2009 National Heads-Up Poker Championship. Rousso became an official GoDaddy Girl, replacing Amanda Beard, Russo appeared in a commercial with former racecar driver Danica Patrick along with former wrestler/model Candice Michelle during Super Bowl XLV in 2011. Rousso's contract as a spokesman for the company was renewed through to the final 2013 Heads-Up tournament event.

Rousso is regarded as one of the sexiest poker players in the world, ranking 18th by Bleacher Report in 2010, and in the top 20 by Maxim in 2010.

Rousso has worked with American Poker Player, writing on game theory, and worked with Forbes, teaching poker to its "100 Most Powerful Women".

== Non-poker activities ==
Rousso appeared on Million Dollar Challenge in 2009. She was a celebrity judge on Bank of Hollywood where she helped award some of her own money to contestants. She was a contestant on season 17 of the reality television show Big Brother in 2015, finishing in third place.

Rousso has become a music producer and DJ and has formed a DJ Duo called N1TEL1TE with her wife Melissa Ouellet. The duo released their first song, "Kiss Face", in February 2017.

== Personal life ==
She resides in South Florida. Her nickname, "Lady Maverick", was given to her by a relative when she sold shares of herself to enter a $25,000 buy-in event in a manner reminiscent of the eponymous hero of the 1994 Western movie Maverick.

Rousso was married to Chad Brown, another professional poker player. They were engaged in December 2007 and planned for a 2009 wedding but after about two years of marriage, they separated then divorced in 2012 but remained close until his death from cancer.

Rousso is married to her long-time girlfriend, Melissa Ouellett; to whom she became engaged in 2015 at the wrap party for Big Brother.

In 2019, Rousso announced that her wife, Ouellett, was pregnant. Two months later, the couple announced that Rousso was also pregnant, expecting identical twin boys. Ouellett gave birth to a son on February 15, 2020, and Rousso gave birth a month later.
