= G. S. F. Napier =

British Army Officer and philatelist (1862–1942)

Lieut. Colonel George S.F. Napier
- Born: c. 1862
- Died: 29 January 1942
- Military career
- Allegiance: United Kingdom
- Branch: British Army
- Rank: Lieutenant-Colonel

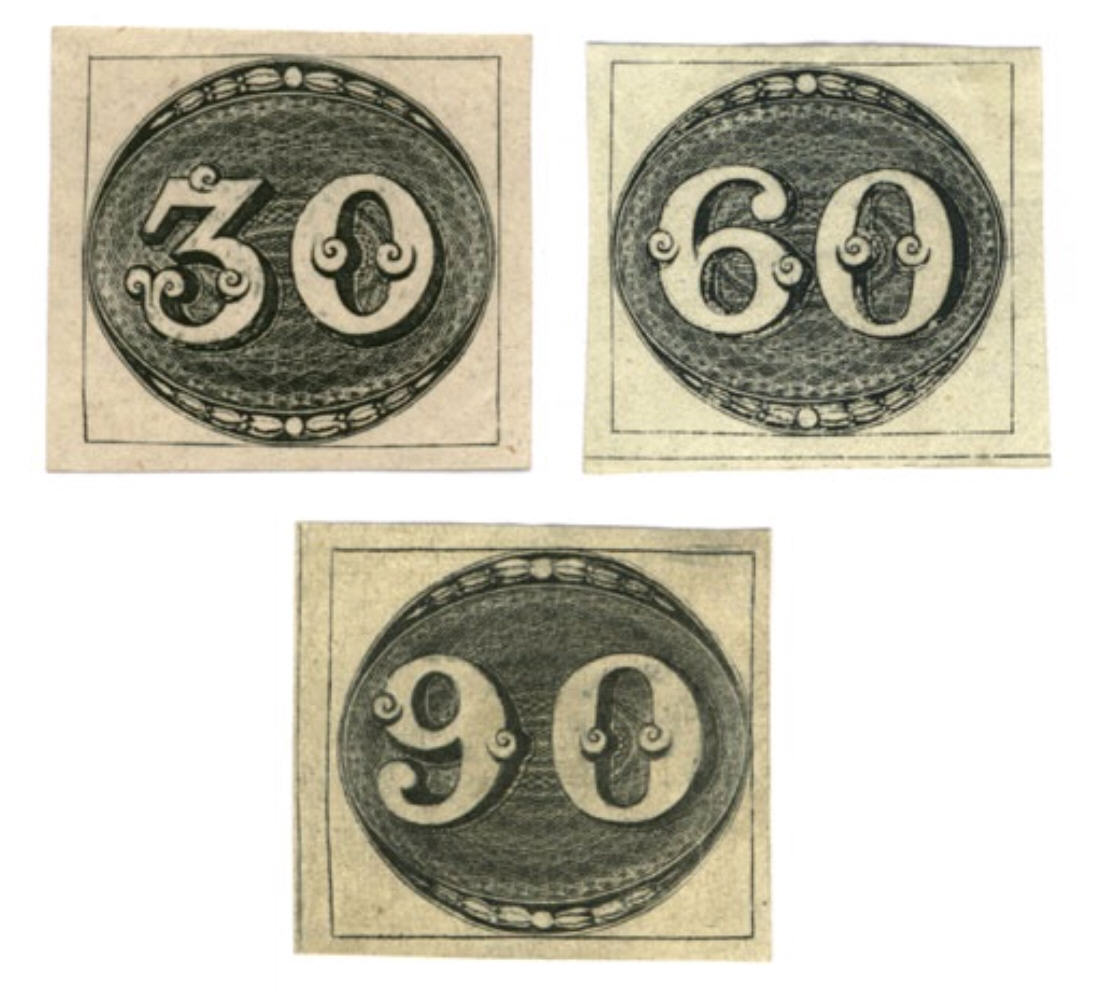
Napier was an expert on the "Bull's Eye" stamps of Brazil.

Lieut. Colonel George S. F. Napier (c. 1862 – 29 January 1942) was a British Army officer of the 52nd Oxfordshire Light Infantry.

Napier was also a noted philatelist, who was a specialist in the stamps of Brazil. In 1924 he was awarded the Crawford Medal by the Royal Philatelic Society London for his work The stamps of the first issue of Brazil. Napier's classification of the Bull's Eyes contained errors, but has largely survived to this day as the most widely used system for describing the issue.

Napier was also knowledgeable about the stamps of Iran, North Borneo and Liberia. He compiled an index of the fourteen catalogues from the sale of the Ferrary collection.

== Selected publications ==
- The stamps of the first issue of Brazil. London: Sefi, Pemberton & Co., Ltd., 1923. (Limited edition of 200, later reprinted.)
- "Types of the Second Issue" in The London Philatelist, January 1940.
- "100 Reis Bi-colored Stamps of 1891–92" in Collectors Club Philatelist, 1943. (With Henry A. Meyer)

== See also ==
- Hugo Goeggel
