= United States postmasters' provisional stamps =

US postage, issued 1845–1847

In the Act of March 3, 1845, the United States Congress standardized postal rates throughout the nation at 5¢ for a normal-weight letter transported up to 300 miles and 10¢ for a letter transported between 300 and 3,000 miles, with these rates to take effect on July 1, 1845.

In Great Britain, such uniformity had been adopted as a necessary prelude to the issue, in May 1840, of the world's first adhesive postage stamps, to be used for the prepayment of mail. (Before this standardization, the many different postal rates in different jurisdictions had made fees too unpredictable to prepay all letters with stamps as a matter of course, with the result that recipients of letters—rather than senders—generally paid the postage on them.) It was clearly Britain’s standardization that led the U.S. Congress to do likewise in 1845; but while preliminary versions of the Act of March 3 also dealt with the possibility of issuing stamps, the law finally enacted did not authorize the U.S. Post office to do so.

Local postmasters, however, now realized that uniform rates made it practical for them to issue postage stamps of their own for pre-payment of mail; and between 1845 and 1847 such Postmasters' Provisional stamps were sold in eleven United States municipalities. The first provisionals issued were those of New York and Baltimore, which appeared on July 14 and 15, 1845; New Haven and St. Louis issues appeared later that year. The remaining seven jurisdictions apparently all introduced their stamps in 1846. Examples of the eleven provisional issues are shown below.

U.S. Postmasters' Provisional Stamps, 1845–1847

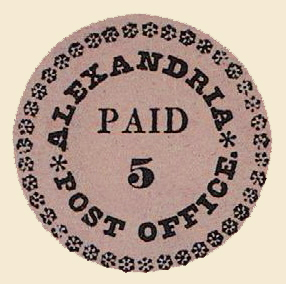
Alexandria, D.C. (Note: When the Alexandria Provisionals were first issued, the city was still part of the District of Columbia, but was in the process of being retroceded to the State of Virginia, a process finalized on March 13, 1847. While buff-colored copies are known to have been used before that date, the "Blue Boy" was not postmarked until November 1847, and may thus have been produced when the city was already "Alexandria, Virginia.")

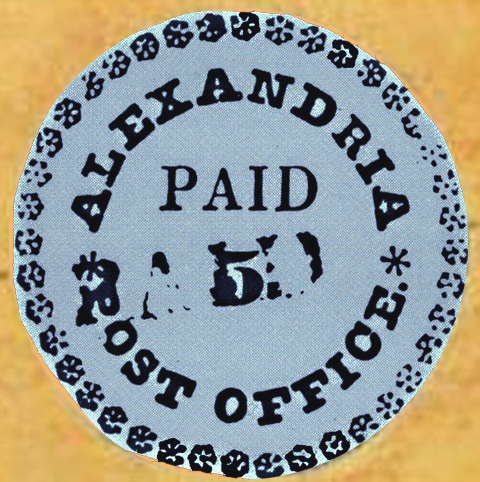
Alexandria "Blue Boy" ^{[note 1]}

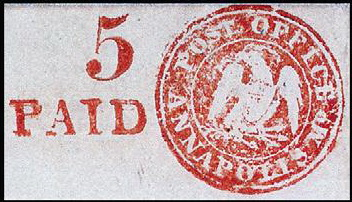
Annapolis, MD

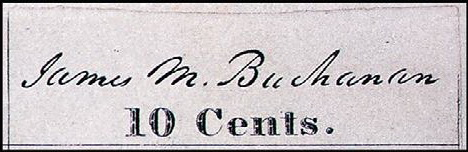
Baltimore, MD

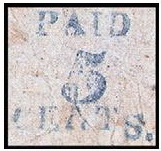
Boscawen, NH

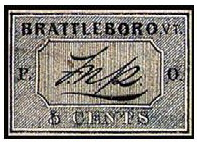
Brattleboro, VT

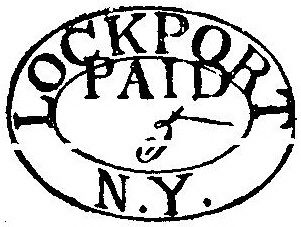
Lockport, NY

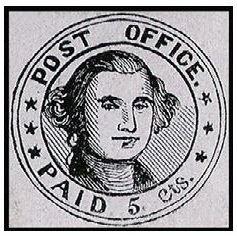
Millbury, MA

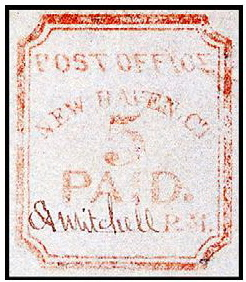
New Haven, CT

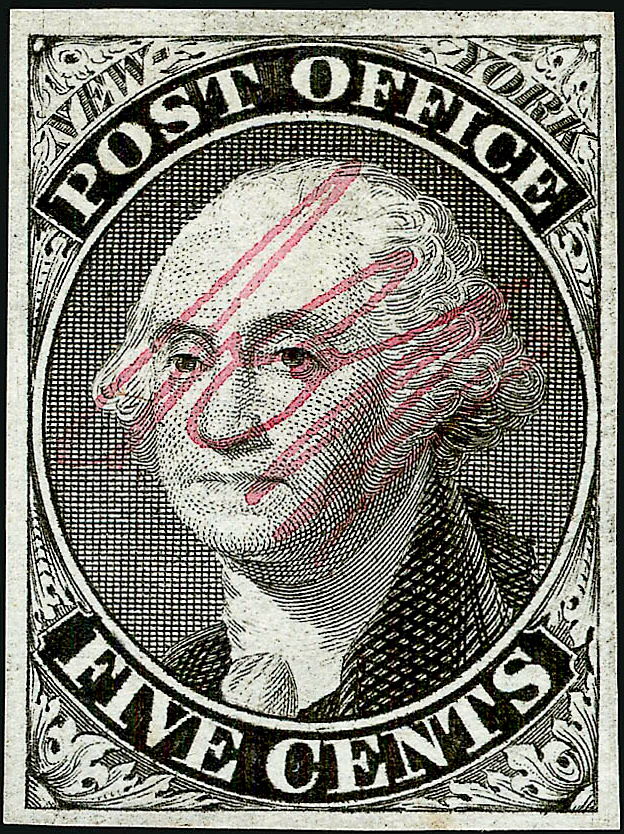
New York, NY

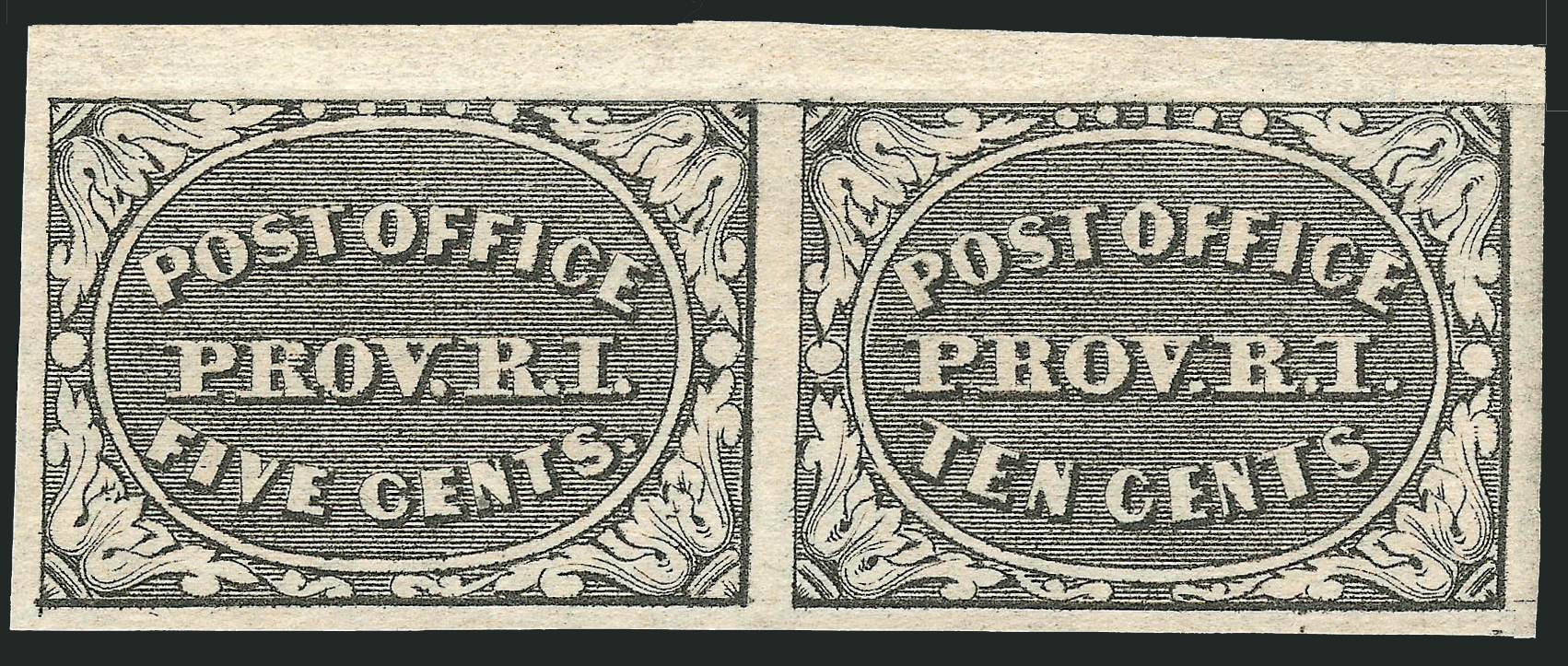
Providence, RI

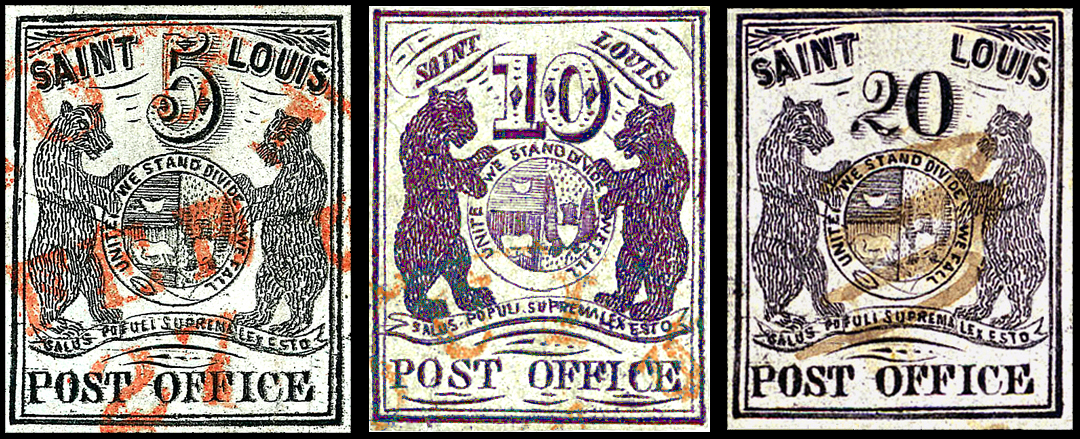
St. Louis, MO

The designs of the eleven provisional issues varied widely in sophistication, as did the methods used to produce them. Five were printed in sheets from engraving plates:

- New York (steel-plate; forty subjects)
- Baltimore (twelve subjects: nine 5¢ stamps, three 10¢ stamps) (Note: Baltimore also employed three handstamps of the "James M. Buchanan" signature to imprint indicia on envelopes. The signature is not that of the future president, but of his cousin: James Madison Buchanan, the Postmaster of Baltimore.)
- Brattleboro (copperplate, ten subjects)
- Providence (copperplate, twelve subjects: eleven 5¢ stamps, one 10¢ stamp)
- St. Louis (copperplate, six subjects: three 5¢ stamps, three 10¢ stamps; plate later modified [1846] to produce one 5¢ stamp, three 10¢ stamps and two 20¢ stamps).

Two provisional issues were typeset:

- Alexandria (two subjects)
- Boscawen.

The Millbury stamp was printed from a woodcut; the New Haven and Lockport issues were handstamped; the Annapolis provisional was an indicium printed on an envelope.

The rarest of the provisionals, known in but a single copy, are those of Boscawen and Lockport. Unique as well is the Alexandria "Blue Boy" variant, the only surviving example printed on blue paper. According to census data supplied by Siegel Auctions, only six additional copies of the Alexandria Provisional are known, all on buff-colored paper. Notably rare as well are the provisionals of Annapolis (2 copies extant), New Haven (11 copies) and Millbury (19 copies). Baltimore 10¢ labels are also scarce (7 copies). Five hundred copies of the Brattleboro issue were produced, but only 52 are known. Providence printed at least 5,500 5¢ stamps and 500 10¢ stamps. The first two printings of the St. Louis provisional produced 2,000 5¢ stamps, 3,000 10¢ stamps and 1,000 20¢ stamps; the final printing probably added 1,500 5¢ stamps and 1,500 10¢ stamps, making a grand total of 9,000 provisionals produced. Among the eleven provisionals, the New York issue was produced in the largest quantity by far, with 143,600 stamps delivered to the New York Post Office.

The national U. S. stamps introduced on July 1, 1847 essentially conformed to the design features of the New York Postmaster's provisional—not surprisingly, given that both the provisional and national issues were designed and printed by the same New York firm (Rawdon, Wright, Hatch and Edson). With the issue of stamps for nationwide use, postmasters' provisionals became obsolete—having played, however, an appreciable role in accustoming the public to the use of stamps for prepaying postal fees.

== See also ==
- Alexandria "Blue Boy" Postmaster's Provisional
- St. Louis Bears
- New York Postmaster's Provisional
