= Paulo Comelli (philatelist) =

Brazilian philatelist

- Born: March 23, 1943; Rio de Janeiro, Brazil
- Died: May 9, 2011 (aged 68); Belo Horizonte, Braz
- Occupation: Philatelist

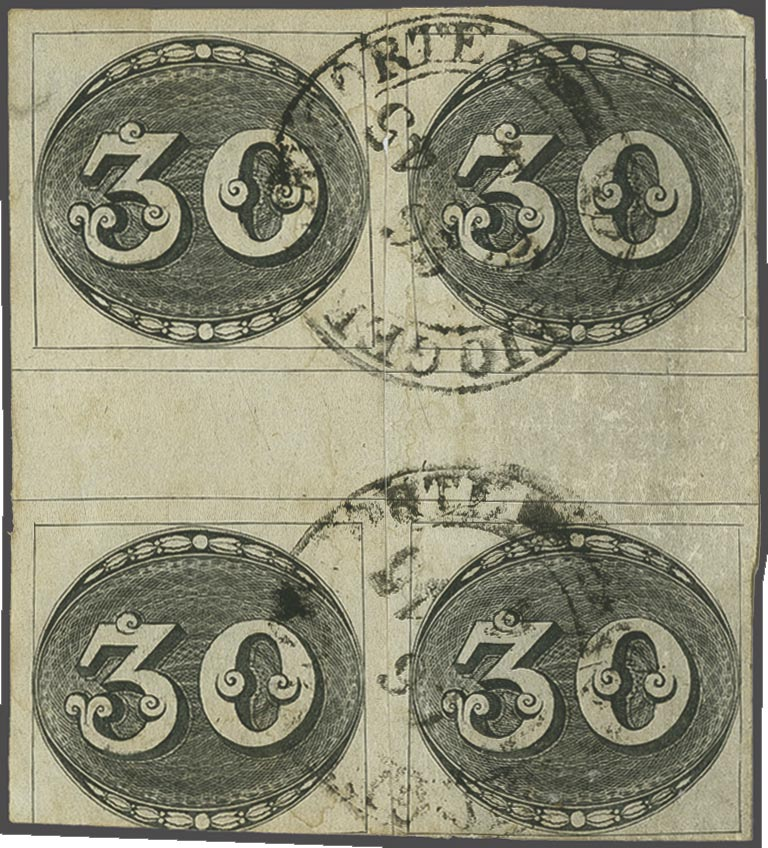
The 30 reis interpane block of Bull's Eyes, used 1845, that Comelli bought for Angelo Lima in 1987.

The personalised postage stamp produced as a tribute to Comelli.

Paulo Rodolpho Comelli FRPSL (Rio de Janeiro, 23 March 1943 - 9 May 2011, Belo Horizonte, Brazil) was a Brazilian philatelist who signed the Roll of Distinguished Philatelists in 2007.

== Collecting ==
Comelli was an expert in the philately of his home country and won many awards for his displays, including the Grand Prix National in 1993 for his Dom Pedro II exhibit and the Grand Prix International at Indipex 2011 in New Delhi for his exhibit Brazilian Mail to Foreign Destinations. Unfortunately, it was in India that he contracted the pneumonia that was to kill him. Comelli was a close friend of Hugo Goeggel and Angelo Lima. For Lima, he purchased the 30 reis interpane block of Brazilian Bull's Eyes in 1987 at a Feldman auction.

Comelli was a regular contributor to the Fakes Forgeries Experts journal of the AIEP, and in 2002 wrote a masterful history of the ownership of the Xiphopagus Triplet (The "Pack Strip") of Brazil for The London Philatelist.

== Organised philately ==
Comelli was a director of the AIEP (Association Internationale des Experts en Philatélie) and was elected as a director of the Fédération Internationale de Philatélie in 2008. For 17 years, he was President of the Brazilian Philatelic Chamber, and he was Editor of MOSAICO, the journal of Brazilian philately. He was a Fellow of the Royal Philatelic Society London.

== Outside philately ==
Comelli graduated in Economics (1965) from the Federal University of Minas Gerais. He married Jane Vargas Neto Comelli, and they had four daughters, Flávia, Carla, Cláudia and Cíntia. His career was in real estate and the stock exchange and he was an executive of several companies.

== Tributes ==
As a tribute to Comelli, Spanish philatelist Arturo Ferrer arranged for Comelli to appear on a Spanish personalised stamp in 2011.
