= Postage stamps and postal history of Baden =

Postage stamps and postal history of Baden refers to the postal history and postage stamps of the German state of Baden from 1851 to 1871.

== Pre-stamp period ==
The dukes of Thurn und Taxis had great influence on the postal development of Baden. From 1718 to 1811, they established their own postal system and took over the postal organisation. It was 1811 before the postal administration changed hands to Baden's authority with the Zessionsvertrag (Assignment Treaty) of Thurn und Taxis. The postal system continued to develop, and on 1 May 1851 Baden joined the German-Austrian Postal Union. On the same day, Baden's first stamps were issued.

== Stamp issues ==
=== First stamps ===
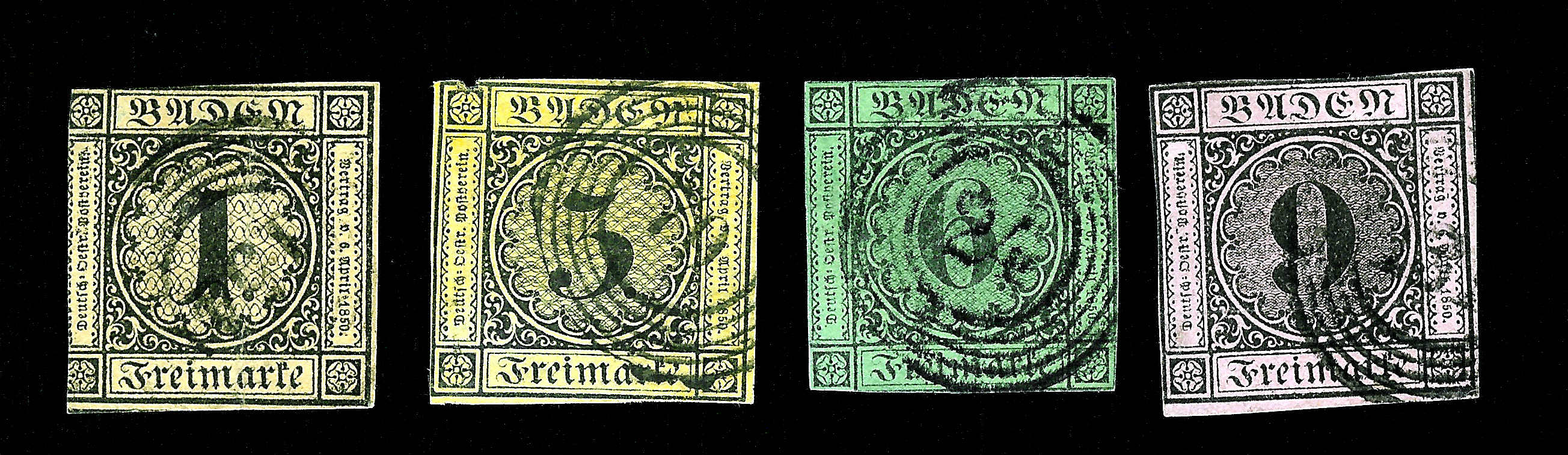
Baden Kreuzer 1, 3, 6, and 9

On 1 May 1851 the first definitive stamps, the 1, 3, 6, and 9 Kreuzer, were issued in the Grand Duchy of Baden. With these denominations, all important postage tariffs were covered in both distance and weight. Baden's first four stamps were designed on the model of Bavaria's stamps. They are cipher designs highlighting the postage denomination. Additionally they have the inscription "Baden" and "Freimarke" (definitive stamp) as well as "Deutsch-Österreichischer-Postverein / Vertrag 6. April 1850" (German-Austrian Postal Union / Treaty, 6 April 1850) to emphasise joining the postal union.

=== 9 Kreuzer green ===
Philatelists refer to the colour misprint of the 9 Kreuzer value of the first stamp issue in cyan instead of pink as the "9 Kreuzer error". The stamps were printed with black ink on coloured paper; green paper was intended for the 6 Kreuzer value, but mistakenly used to print a number of 9 Kreuzer stamps. Four examples are known: one, unused, which was auctioned in 2008 for €1,314,500, and three that are cancelled: one, last seen in 1919, on a piece, and two on letters. Of the two covers, one was sold to the Reichspost Museum and is now in Berlin's Museum of Post and Communication, the other, still in private hands, from the German States collection of John R. Boker, Jr., was sold at the Heinrich Köhler auction of Boker's collection in 1985 for $833,595. The error is one of the great philatelic rarities of the world.

=== Further stamp issues 1860–1868 ===
Until 1871 (last year of their validity), the Grand Duchy of Baden issued 28 different stamps. Following the cipher design of the first issue, the Baden's coat of arms was prominent in the next issues.

==== 1860 Perforate 13 1/2 ====
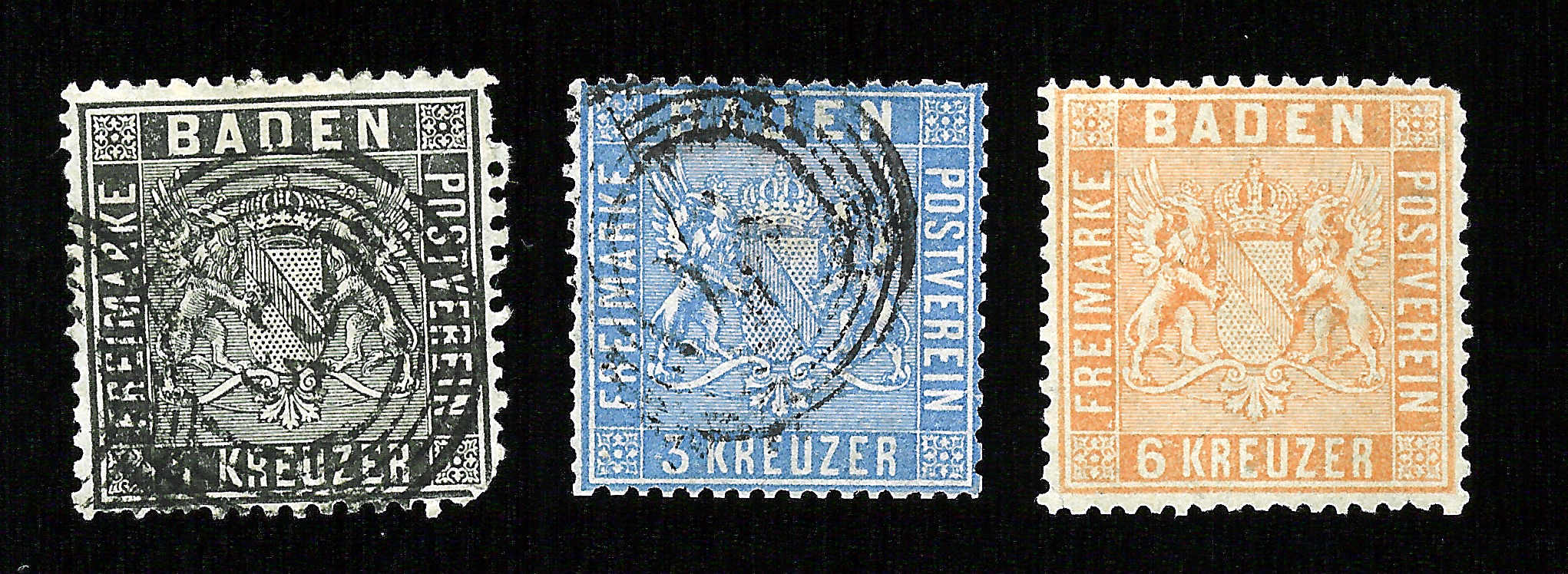
The 1860 issue with the coat of arms

While the first issues were imperforate, in 1860 the first perforated stamps were issued, but the execution of the rather tight perforation was not always perfect.

==== 1862 Perforate 10 ====
An easier, wider perforation, values 1 to 9 kreuzer. Background with fine lines (again).

==== 1862–1865 ====
Background is white. Values 1 to 30 kreuzer.

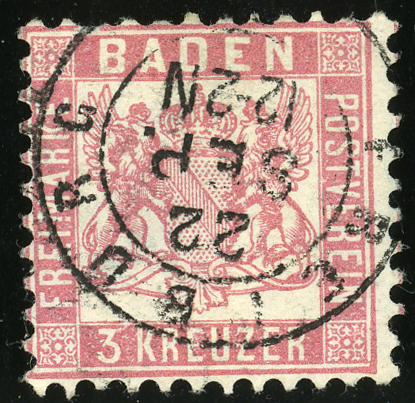
3 kreuzer, cancelled at FREIBURG

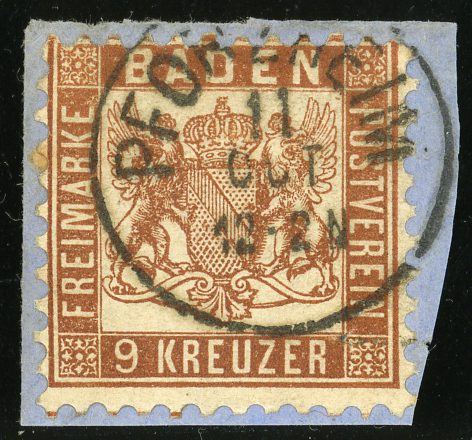
9 kreuzer, cancelled at PFORZHEIM

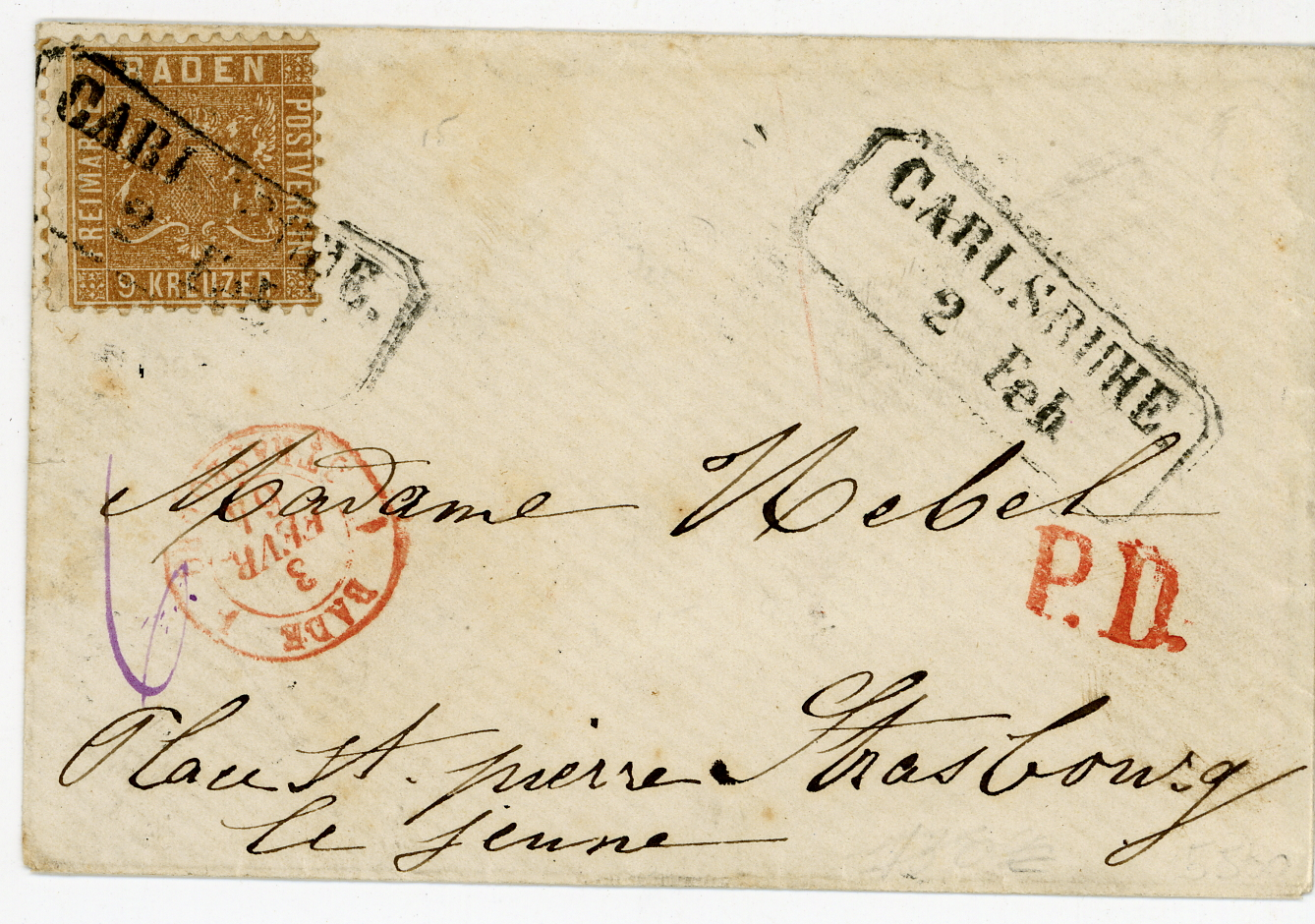
Envelope, with 9 kreuzer, cancelled at CARLSRUHE in 1864, sent to Strasbourg

==== October 1868 ====
Three values, noted 1, 3 and 7 KR.

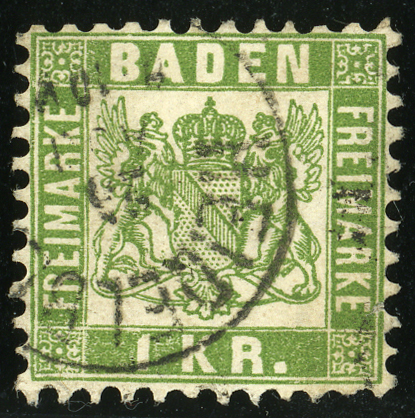
1 KR., cancelled at HEIDELBERG

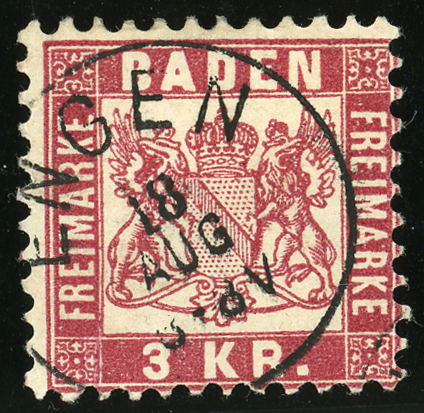
3 KR., cancelled at ENGEN

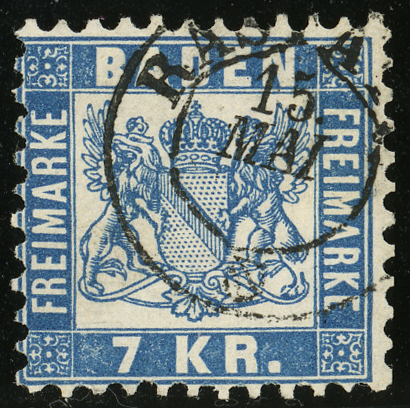
7 KR., cancelled at RASTATT

=== Landpost ===
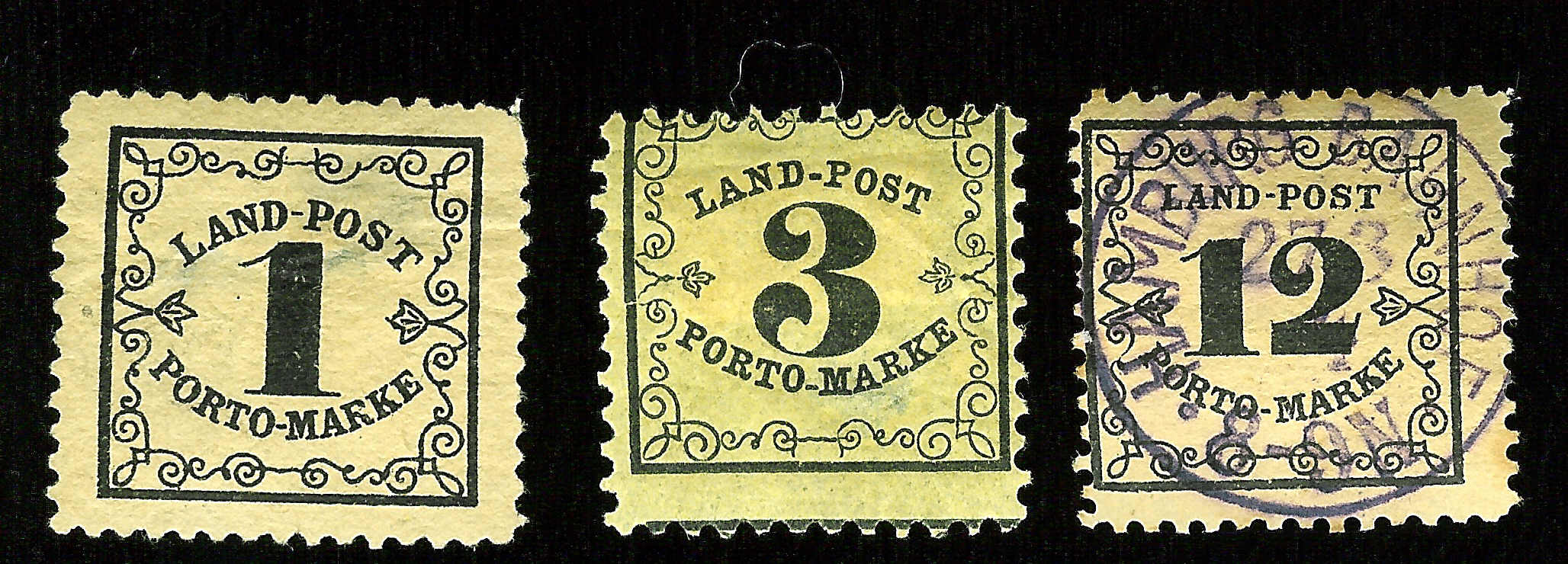
Landpost stamps

The Landpost postage due stamps are a special area in Baden's postal history. The three values of 1, 3, and 12 Kreuzer were issued on 1 October 1862. These stamps were not given to postal customers during their valid period and could not be used as definitive stamps.

With these stamps, additional delivery charges to addresses in rural villages, not served by a local post office, were paid. The sender could choose to pre-pay the charge. The Landpost stamps were not regular Postage Due stamps, although their use as such, and for other charges, is also known. They should have been stuck on the reverse, but are often seen on the front.

=== Forgeries ===
Forgeries are known of a number of Baden stamps. If the 1853 white 1 Kreuzer stamp is immersed in tea or coffee for a long time, the paper colour appears like that of the 1851 1 Kreuzer issue, which increases its value tenfold, however the shade is a not as saturated as an original. When the stamp is dipped into warm water, the staining of the falsified stamp dissolves and the water darkens. The 3 Kreuzer stamp is also endangered. The 1862 stamp, perforated 13½, with unusual narrow margin or especially nice perforation, can be made from the stamp perforated 10, to increase its value significantly. Both stamps need to be the same size. Forgeries of the 18 Kreuzer stamp are fairly primitive; the characters are different and can be clearly distinguished by comparing it to other stamps of the series. The 30 Kreuzer stamp occasionally has a forged cancellation. In this case, only an inspector can help.

The Landpost stamps are often found uncancelled as total forgeries. On these, the leaf that points towards the value number is not very successfully done and can be identified through comparison. The paper is also browner.

== Joining the German Reich ==
On 31 December 1871 the entire postal system of Baden changed hands to the German Reichspost and since then the postal history of Baden is part of the German Reich. Baden's stamps could only be used until the end of 1871, but Baden stamps could be exchanged for stamps of the German Reich until 25 February 1872.

== References and sources ==
Sources

- B. E. Crole: Geschichte der Deutschen Post. 2nd edition. Publishing house W. Malende in Leipzig, Leipzig 1889. The author is Bruno Emil König from Berlin.
- K. Schwarz (Postrat): Zeittafel zur deutschen Postgeschichte. R.V.Deckers Verlag, Berlin 1935, vol. 22 Post- und Telegraphie in Wissenschaft und Praxis.
- Handwörterbuch des Postwesens. Frankfurt am Main 1953, ASIN B0000BJ291
