= Postage stamps and postal history of Brazil =

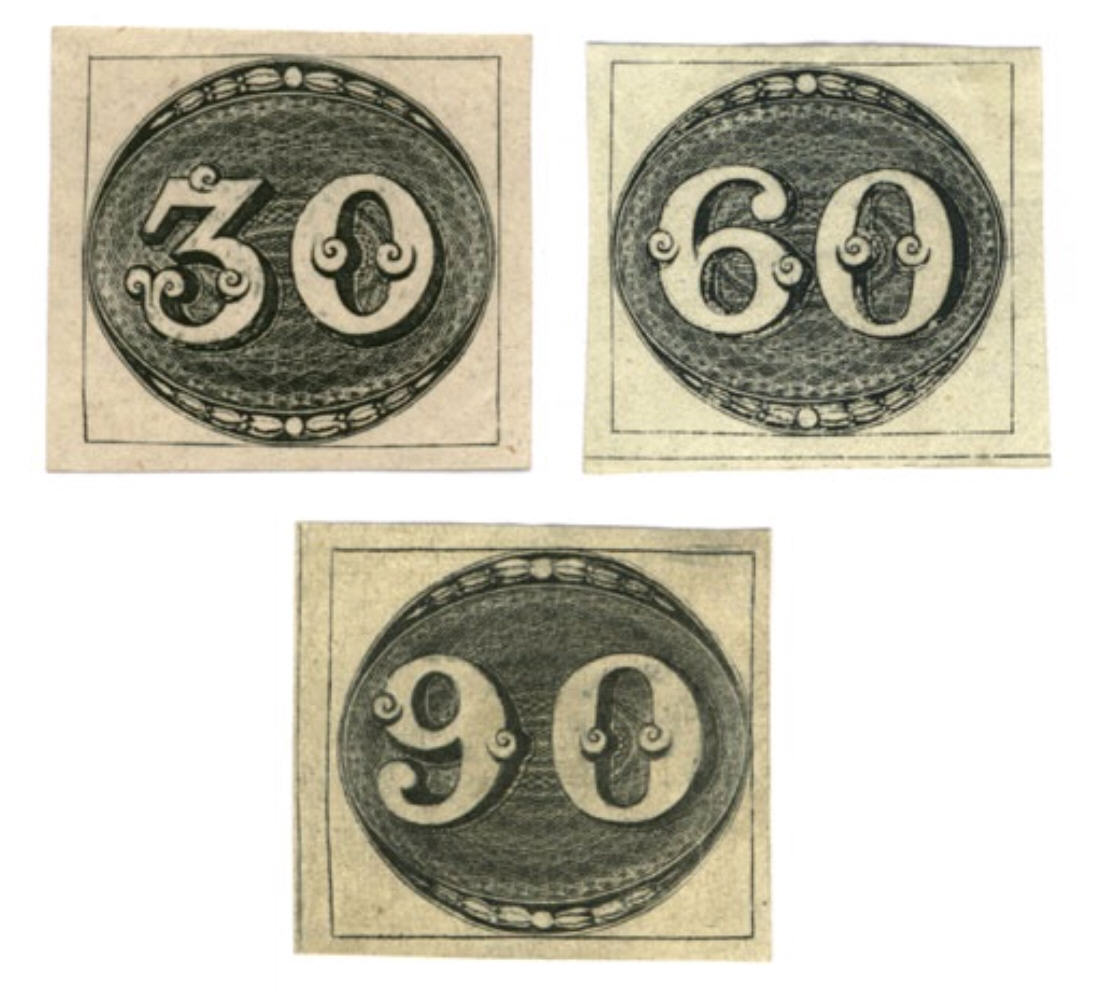
The first 1843 "Bull's Eye" issue

Brazil is the fifth largest country in the world. It was a colony of Portugal from 1500 until 1815.

Brazil was the second country in the world, after Great Britain, to issue postage stamps valid within the entire country (as opposed to a local issue). Like Great Britain's first stamps, the design does not include the country name.

== First stamps ==
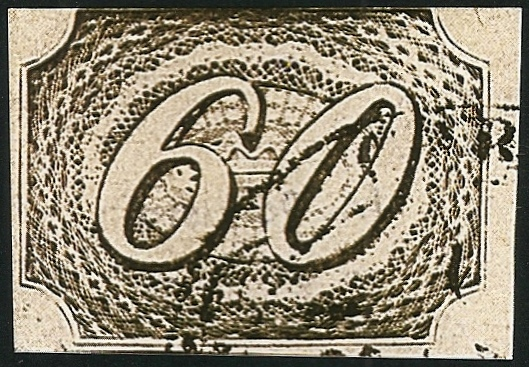
An 1844 slanted numeral stamp of Brazil

The first stamps of Brazil were issued on 1 August 1843 and are known as "Bull's Eyes" due to their distinctive appearance. On 1 July 1844 a new series was issued which is known as the slanted numeral series. Subsequent stamps were in a similar format until the first pictorial stamps were issued in 1866 depicting Emperor Dom Pedro II

== Pedro II issues ==
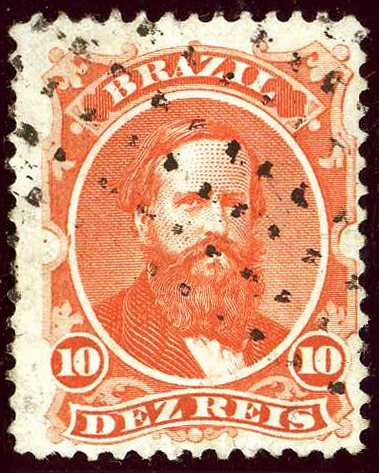
Pedro II with the black beard

In 1866 the emperor was represented on all issues until 1884, first with a black beard.

== Recent issues ==
For many years stamps from Brazil had Brasil Correio displayed on them. However, starting from 1973 stamps show the country name and year, e.g. Brasil 2000.

== Telegraph stamps ==
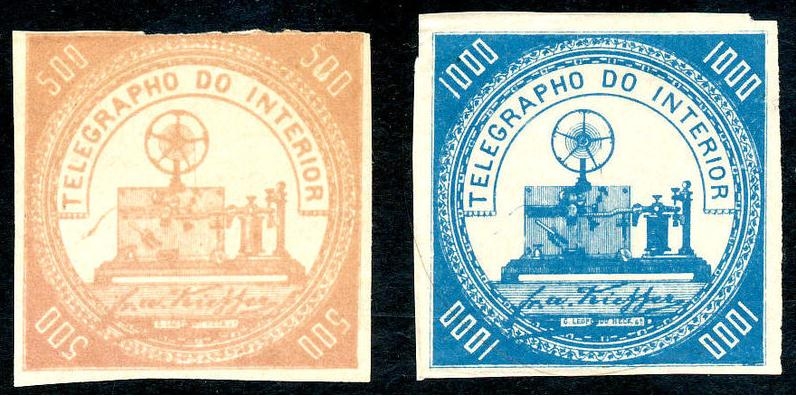
1871 telegraph stamps of Brazil
