= Accoona =

Internet search engine company

- Website type: B2B search engine

Accoona was an internet company with offices in Jersey City, New Jersey, and Shanghai, China. Their main product was a search engine that claimed to use artificial intelligence to better understand searches. On June 23, 2005, in the ABC Times Square Studios, the AI Accoona Toolbar, driven by a Fritz 9 prototype, played against the chess grandmaster Rustam Kasimdzhanov. In addition to traditional searches, it allows business profile searches, and its signature "SuperTarget" feature. Their exclusive partnership with China Daily, a large Chinese internet portal, was seen as a highly strategic move.

The CEO of Accoona was Valentine J. Zammit, formerly of 24/7 Real Media and DoubleClick.

After IPO problems, Accoona shut down on October 5, 2008.

In October 2008 the web page said: "Dear Accoona search users, Due to an overwhelmingly competitive search market, Accoona.com and Accoona.cn will no longer be active. We thank you for your previous support. Sincerely, Accoona Management."

Accoona's domains and search facilities were acquired by Masterseek B2B (business-to-business) search engine on October 30, 2008.

== Partnerships ==
Accoona provided the search technology to the Chinese portals Sina.com and Sohu. They also formed a 20-year exclusive partnership with China Daily. Through this partnership and its widespread Chinese affiliates, Accoona expected 10 million hits daily from the otherwise isolated Chinese user base.

Accoona signed a deal with FAST Search from Norway to help enhance their rankings.

== Press ==
- Accoona received attention after selecting former President Bill Clinton as a spokesperson on December 8, 2004.
- Accoona also received significant coverage from the webmaster community after many forum sites were spammed with promotional Accoona entries.
- Accoona was selected among the "50 Coolest Websites" of 2006 by Time magazine.

== See also ==
- Comparison of web search engines
- List of search engines
- Timeline of web search engines
