= Million Dollar Challenge (TV program) =

American poker television show

- Million Dollar Challenge logo
- Starring: Chris Rose; Daniel Negreanu
- Country of origin: United States
- Original language: English
- No. of seasons: 2
- No. of episodes: 13

Production
- Executive producers: Mark Mayer, M&M Productions

Original release
- Network: Fox
- Release: October 11, 2009 – December 12, 2010

Million Dollar Challenge (also referred to as the PokerStars Million Dollar Challenge and PokerStars.net Million Dollar Challenge) is the most watched poker show in television history. It is sponsored by PokerStars. The show, which airs on the Fox Broadcasting Company, debuted on October 11, 2009. The show is hosted by Chris Rose and features Daniel Negreanu. The first season included five episodes following the FOX network Sunday National Football League coverage. The finale aired on December 27, 2009. The eight-episode season 2 premiered on September 19, 2010 and concluded on December 12.

== Show description ==
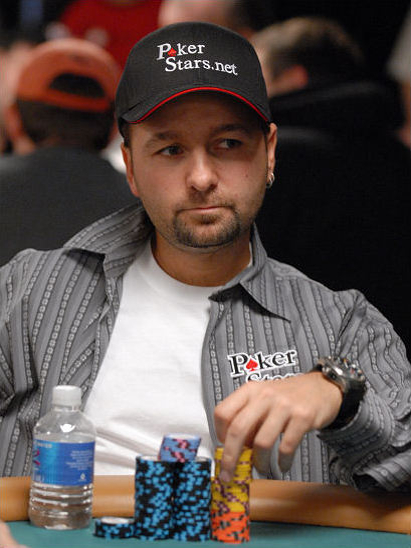
Daniel Negreanu is the main star of the show

Million Dollar Challenge is a poker game show where amateur poker players attempt to defeat celebrities, professional poker players and, eventually, Daniel Negreanu in order to win the show's grand prize, $1 million. In the first round, the amateur (with Negreanu at their side, acting as their coach and lending advice) must defeat a celebrity such as Jayde Nicole, Jerome Bettis, Joanna Krupa, John Salley or Tito Ortiz. If the contestant is able to defeat the celebrity the contestant wins a trip to the Bahamas and advances to the second round. In the second round, the amateur (with Negreanu now helping them from a sound proof booth, giving them advice through a listening device in the amateur's ear) must defeat a professional poker player such as Vanessa Rousso, Barry Greenstein, Joe Cada or Chris Moneymaker. If the contestant is able to defeat the professional the contestant wins $25,000 in addition to the trip to the Bahamas. At this point, the amateur has a decision to make. Keep the money and walk away $25,000 richer, or risk the money (the trip is still theirs to keep) and play Daniel Negreanu heads-up for $100,000, knowing that if they lose they walk away with nothing but the trip to the Bahamas. In the season finale, the champions from each episode compete against each other in a sit-n-go tournament, the winner of which becomes the champion for the season and plays Negreanu for $1 million.

== Season 1 ==
The first three episodes of the season were the three most-watched Poker television shows in U.S. history. The show aired on Sundays after the FOX National Football League coverage. In the first episode that aired on October 11, contestant Father Andrew Trapp defeated John Salley, Rousso and Negreanu, winning $100,000 and a trip to the Bahamas in the process, all of which he promised to donate to his church in Garden City, South Carolina. Trapp also won the chance to play in a mini-tournament (Episode 5), the winner of which would play Negreanu for $1,000,000. On October 18, after contestant Tracy Nguyen defeated Bettis and won a trip to the Bahamas, but lost to Barry Greenstein, the next contestant Sergeant Denny Luna defeated Nicole, Moneymaker to win $25,000 and a trip to the Bahamas. Luna then chose to walk away (and not risk the $25,000 he had already won) rather than face Negreanu in the $100,000 match. On the November 22 episode after contestant Oluwasegun Odumuyiwa lost to Bettis, Brian Barboza defeated Nicole, Rousso and Negreanu, winning $100,000 and a trip to the Bahamas. Barboza also won the chance to play in a mini-tournament, the winner of which would play Negreanu for $1,000,000. In December Joanna Krupa and Joe Cada were announced as newly added as celebrity and professional opponents. Ortiz and Krupa appeared on the fourth episode, which aired on December 13. Cada appeared, but he did not play a hand. Dwayne Buth, playing on behalf of the Cal State Fullerton wrestling team, lost to Ortiz. Mike Kosowski, a first responder during the September 11 attacks lost to Krupa. The final airing of the competition among the previous winners was expected on December 27. However, when the contestants on the fourth episode all lost, a single table tournament was held to determine the fourth contestant. Kosowski won and then bested Luna, Barboza and Trapp, in that order, in the Challenge of Champions for a $100,000 prize, becoming the season 1 champion, and a chance to play Negreanu for $1 million. In three hands of heads up play, he bested Negreanu, becoming the show's only million dollar winner.

== Season 2 ==
Season two premiered on September 19 during the second weekend of the 2010 NFL season. The program will continue to air on the FOX network as a companion to the NFL programming on the seven weekends that FOX does not have doubleheaders (September 19 and 26, October 10 and 24, November 7 and 21 and December 12). The show will air before or after the football game depending upon the region of the country.

== Critical review ==
Professional poker player Doyle Brunson has been critical of both Million Dollar Challenge and its contemporary rival Face the Ace as terrible shows unlikely to draw viewers. Negreanu responded, via blog, to this type of criticism that the show is not intended for the serious poker player, but rather is aimed at more casual audience. There was some controversy about a poker playing priest on national television that sparked theological debate.
