= Masterseek =

- Company type: Private
- Industry: Internet; Computer software
- Founded: Denmark (1999)
- Founder: Rasmus Refer
- Headquarters: New York City, United States
- Area served: Worldwide
- Key people: Rasmus Refer (Co-Founder, CEO); Jørgen Trygved (Co-Founder)
- Products: B2B Search Engine
- Subsidiaries: Accoona
- Website: www.masterseek.com

Masterseek Corp. is a B2B (business-to-business) search engine founded in Denmark in 1999.

Masterseek now encompasses 175 million business profiles, 346 million websites, and 450 million contacts of which 216 million are LinkedIn members thus making Masterseek the largest commercial database in the world.

== Founding ==
Masterseek was founded in Denmark by Rasmus Refer in 1999. Their Denmark headquarters is located at Bredgade 29, DK-1260 Kbh. K, and they also have a current headquarters in New York City, at 82 Wall Street.

According to its executives, Masterseek utilizes a business model based on an annual business subscription fee of USD $149, in return for which subscribers receive full editing control over their corporate profile, content and advertising, and control over widgets and embedded video, among other factors.

== Finances ==
As of June 2008, accountancy firm Horwart International had approximated the raw market value of the Masterseek company at $150 million. The company remains privately owned, but also in June 2008, it sold 10% of its authorized stocks to a range of foreign investors. The company announced on January 31, 2009 that they company was again offering a limited number of shares for sale in order to raise $4–6 million in order to gain a listing on the Swedish marketplace AktieTorget. Founder Refer also announced there were plans for an IPO. By October 2009, they had signed with the Swedish-based company Thenberg & Kinde Fondkommission AB for financing.

== Statistics ==
In June 2008, the company stated it had 50 million company profiles, from over 75 countries, and handled 90,000 B2B searches daily. The company stated they had 82 million profiles on March 21, 2011, with an average of 300,000 new profiles added monthly.

In 2017, the company stated it had more than 178 million company profiles.

== Acquiring Accoona ==
On October 30, 2008, it was announced that Masterseek had acquired the B2B search engine Accoona.

The search engine had been fairly successful in the United States and China, where it had an exclusive partnership with China Daily. On August 3, 2006, TIME had dubbed Accoona one of its "50 best websites," illustrating how the search engine used artificial intelligence to "understand" the meaning of keyword queries. Accoona had run into difficulties and gone defunct by early October 2008, withdrawing its IPO. making it possible for Masterseek to acquire their data and technology.

After Masterseek bought the remaining search engine codes, domain name, and assets, Accoona was integrated with Masterseek, and re-launched in the USA and China. It was launched in Europe in January 2009. Accoona information was also integrated into the Masterseek search engine.

== Technology ==
The Masterseek search engine relies on web crawlers that automatically collect and sort company details from the internet. Searches can look up company profiles, contact information, and descriptions of products and services. Searches can be global, national, regional, or involved local markets. Hits are listed by relevance according to search terms. There are different search options, including a specific product search, company searches, and people searches. Results can be displayed in most languages. The search engine also offers MasterRank, a point system for ranking corporate websites.

== Sponsorships ==
On July 5, 2007, Masterseek announced they were cosponsors to Team CSC, Denmark's cycling team, beginning with the team's involvement in the Tour de France. The Masterseek name began to be displayed on the team's apparel that week, with the Tour's start in London.

== Management ==
- Rasmus Refer - Founder and Director

== See also ==
- Accoona
- B2B
- Search engines
