= Treskilling Yellow =

Swedish one-example postage stamp

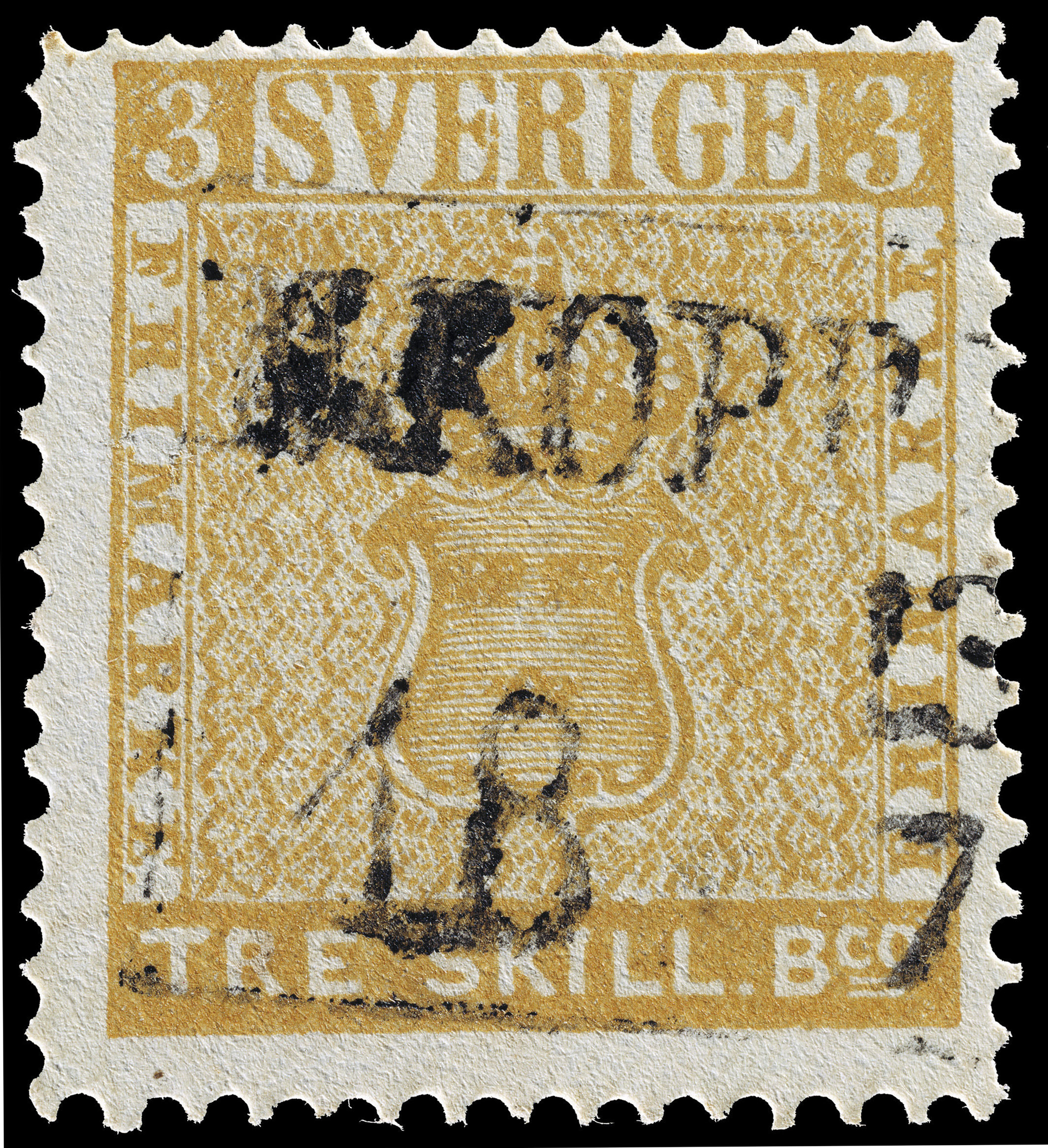
- Country of production: Sweden
- Date of production: 1855
- Nature of rarity: Colour error
- No. in existence: one
- Face value: three Swedish skillings
- Estimated value: At least 2,880,000 Swiss francs or $2,300,000 (last known sale price 1996) €1.5–2 million (estimate in 2010)

The Treskilling Yellow, or three schilling banco error of color (Swedish: Gul tre skilling banco, literally "yellow three skilling banco"), is a Swedish postage stamp of which only one example is known to exist. The stamp was cancelled at Nya Kopparberget (now known as Kopparberg), about 150 kilometres (93 mi) from Uppsala, on July 13, 1857. It was last sold in 2013.

== History ==
Sweden issued its first postage stamps in 1855, depicting the Swedish coat of arms in a set of five denominations ranging from three to 24 Swedish skillings. The three-skilling stamp was normally printed in a blue-green color, with the eight-skilling stamp in yellowish orange. It is not known exactly what went wrong, but the most likely explanation is that a stereotype of the eight-skilling printing plate (which consisted of 100 stereotypes assembled into a 10 × 10 array) was damaged or broken, and it was mistakenly replaced with a three-skilling. The number of stamps printed in the wrong color is unknown, but only one example has been found.

The error went unnoticed at the time, and by 1858 the Swedish currency was changed. The skilling stamps were replaced by new stamps denominated in "öre". In 1886, young collector Georg Wilhelm Backman was going through covers in his grandmother's attic at the farm Väster Munga Gård north of Västerås, and came across one with a three-skilling stamp, for which the Stockholm stamp dealer Heinrich Lichtenstein was offering seven kronor apiece.

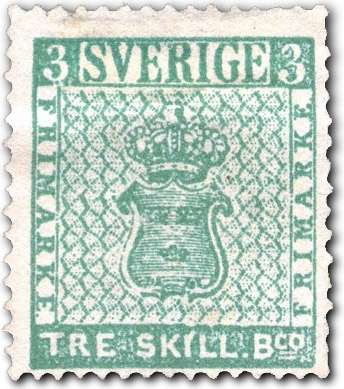
A Treskilling green

After it had changed hands several times, Sigmund Friedl sold it for 4,000 florins to Philipp von Ferrary in 1894, who had at that time the largest stamp collection in the world. As time passed, and no other "yellows" surfaced despite searching, it became clear that the stamp was not only rare, but possibly the only surviving example.

When Ferrary's collection was auctioned in the 1920s, Swedish Baron Eric Leijonhufvud bought the yellow stamp, then Claes A. Tamm bought it in 1926 for £1,500 sterling to complete his collection of Swedish stamps. In 1928, the stamp was sold for £2,000 to the lawyer Johan Ramberg, who kept it for nine years. In 1937, King Carol II of Romania purchased it from London auction house H. R. Harmer for £5,000, and in 1950 it went to Rene Berlingen for an unknown sum.

In the 1970s, the Swedish Postal Museum caused a controversy by declaring the stamp to be a forgery, but after examinations by two different commissions, it was agreed that this was a genuine stamp.

In 1984, the yellow stamp made headlines when it was sold by David Feldman for 977,500 Swiss francs. It was sold again in 1990 for over $1,000,000, and again in 1996 for 2,880,000 Swiss francs. Each successive sale was a world record price for a postage stamp.

On 22 May 2010, the yellow stamp was auctioned by David Feldman in Geneva, Switzerland, "for at least the $2.3 million price [that] it set a record for in 1996". The buyer was an "international consortium" and the seller was a financial firm auctioning the stamp to pay the former owner's debt. The exact price and the identity of the buyer were not disclosed and all bidders were sworn to secrecy; however, the auctioneer stated that it was "still worth more than any other single stamp." The buyer was subsequently identified as Armand Rousso, "a colorful philatelic player ... known ... for a number of high-profile activities."

In May 2013, the stamp was acquired in a private sale by Count Gustaf Douglas, a Swedish nobleman and politician.

== Jean-Claude Andre's lawsuit ==
In or before 2012, Jean-Claude Andre and his wife Jane Andre brought a lawsuit in the High Court of Justice, Chancery Division, London, against Clydesdale Bank PLC, claiming that he had stored a locked trunk at the bank in which he alleged there were six covers bearing a total of nine Treskilling Yellow stamps, along with other less valuable items. Andre claimed to have left the trunk undisturbed from 1986 to 2004, but when he retrieved it the lock had been removed and the covers and stamps taken. Philatelic dealer David Feldman testified that the covers would have been worth some 3.7 million pounds sterling. After a lengthy trial, the court issued a judgment dated 31 January – 1 February 2013, in which it rejected Andre's claim, finding him and his wife unreliable witnesses and their claim suffering from "sheer inherent implausibility".

== In popular culture ==
In episode 2 "Return to Sender" of season 6 of White Collar, Neal Caffrey has to steal the Treskilling Yellow as part of a heist planned by an exclusive group of thieves, The Pink Panthers. The stamp is shown in high detail as Caffrey forges a copy.

== See also ==
- List of most expensive philatelic items
- List of notable postage stamps
