= Bull's Eye (postage stamp) =

Rare Brazilian postage stamp

Bull's Eye (Olho-de-Boi)
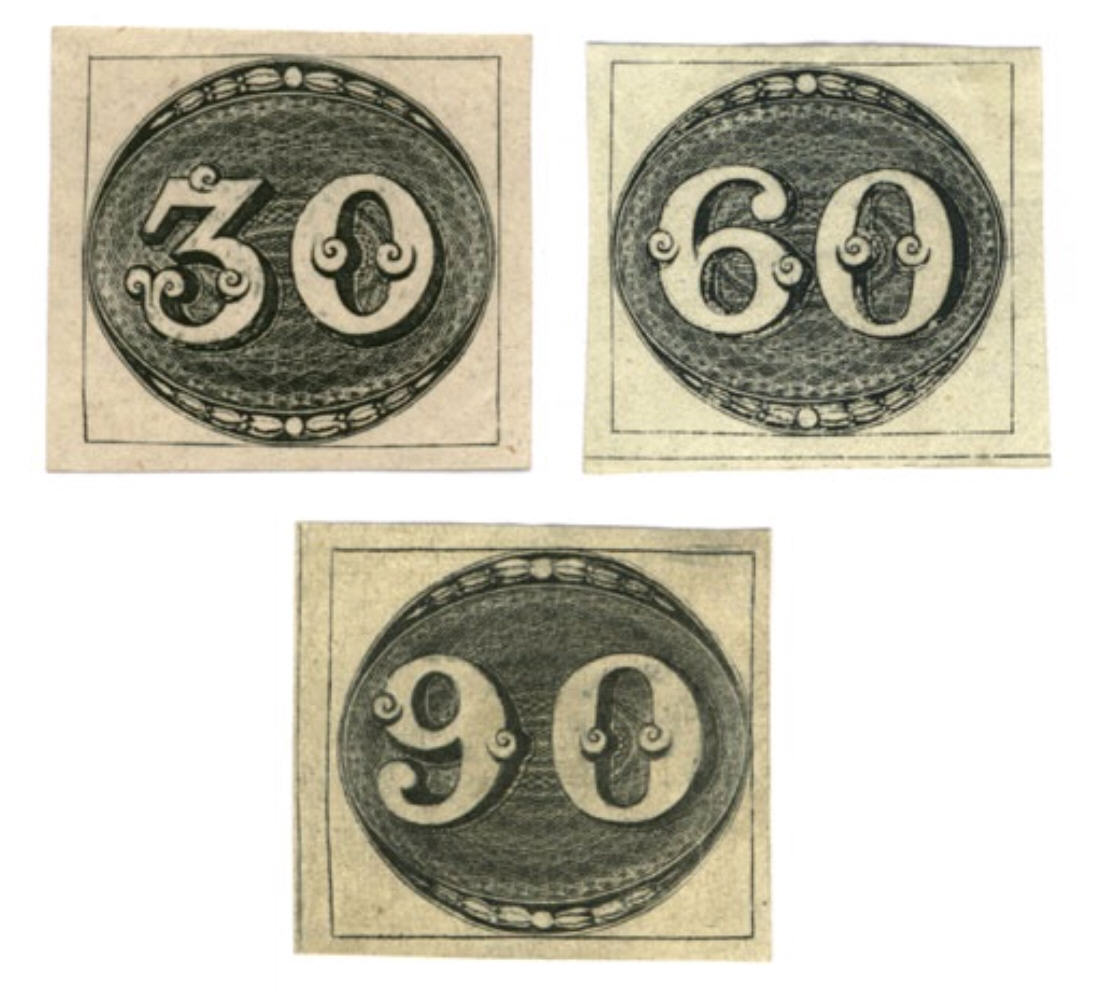
- Country of production: Brazil
- Location of production: Rio de Janeiro
- Date of production: 1 August 1843
- Nature of rarity: Limited number
- No. in existence: Unknown
- Face value: 30, 60 and 90 réis
- Estimated value: between US$ 5,000.00 and US$ 400.00 (RHM – 2004)

The Bull's Eye (Portuguese Olho-de-boi) postage stamps were the first stamps issued by Brazil, on 1 August 1843, having face values of 30, 60, and 90 réis. Brazil was the second country in the world, after the United Kingdom, to issue postage stamps valid within the entire country (as opposed to a local issue). Like the United Kingdoms's first stamps, the design does not include the country name.

The unusual name derives from the ornamental value figures inside the oval settings, and the arrangement of the stamps in the sheet, which permitted se-tenant pairs that looked like a pair of bull's eyes. The unusual naming of Brazilian stamps continued with the later issue of smaller, but rectangular designs, which were nicknamed snake's eyes, and the issue of similar designs to the Bull's Eyes, but smaller, of which the blue were called goat's eyes, and the black, cat's eyes.

There were 1,148,994 30 réis stamps printed, 1,502,142 of the 60 réis value, and 349,182 of the 90 réis stamp. The 90 réis issue were reserved for international mail only.

The most important recent Bull's Eyes collection to be sold was that of Hugo Goeggel in 2013.

== See also ==
- G. S. F. Napier
- List of notable postage stamps
- Postage stamps and postal history of Brazil
