= David Feldman (philatelist) =

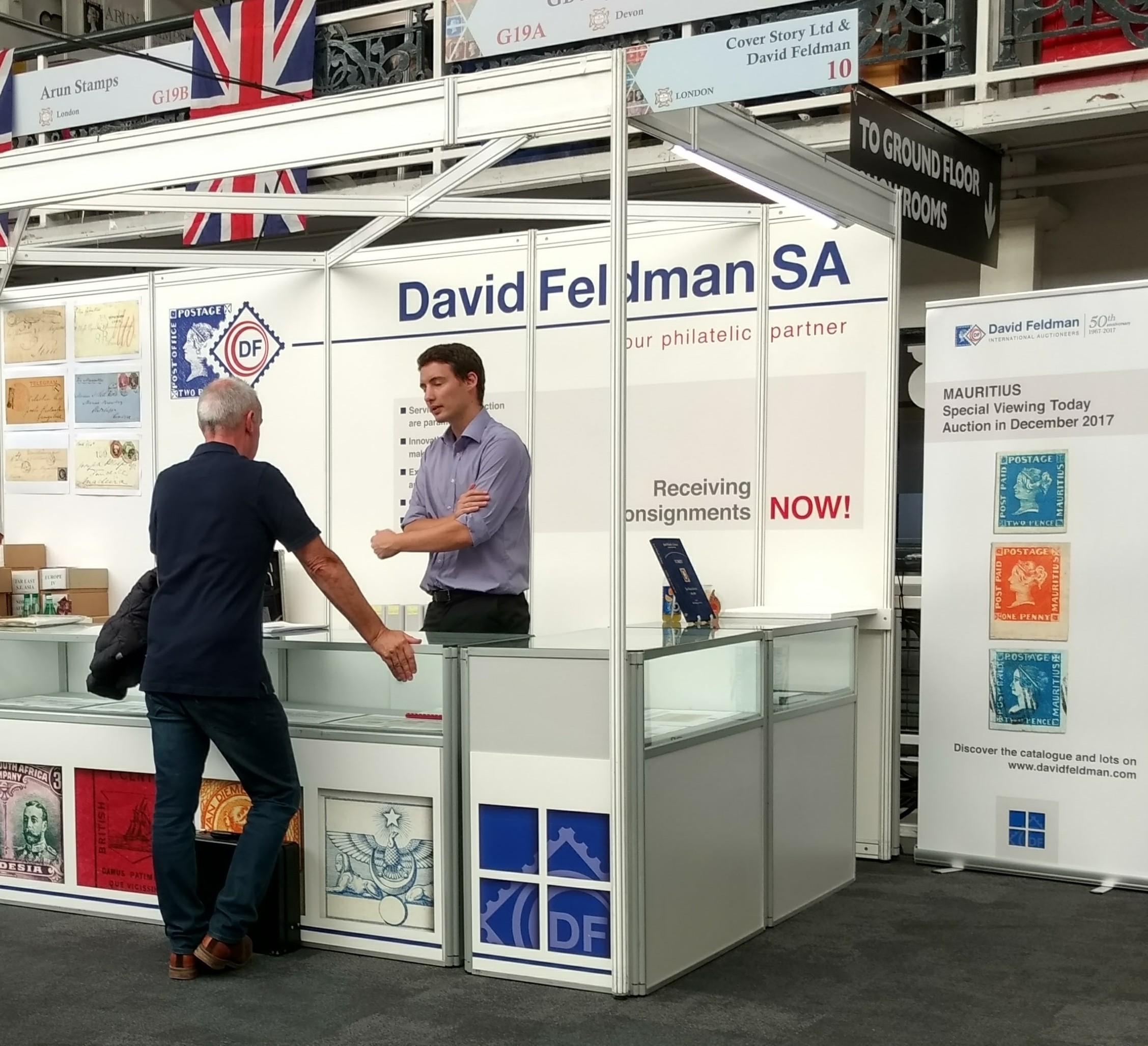
David Feldman SA booth at Autumn Stampex 2017

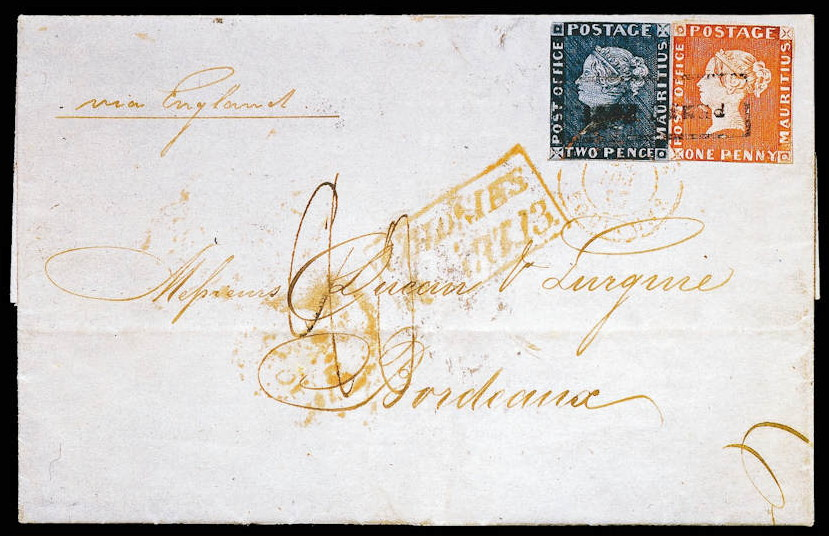
The Bordeaux Cover, sold in 1993

David Feldman (born 1947 in Dublin) MA. BBS, RDP(I).FRPSL is a professional philatelist, auctioneer, art specialist and author. He held his first stamp auction in 1967. Feldman is Honorary Chairman of David Feldman SA, a Geneva-based auction company, through which he attained record prices for some of the world's most famous postage stamps. In 1993, Feldman auctioned the "Bordeaux Cover", which comprised the 1847 1d Orange-red and the 2d Deep Blue Mauritius "Post Office" stamps, which brought 6,175,000 Swiss francs including all commissions, at that time the highest price ever paid for any philatelic item. He also sold the unique 1855 Sweden Treskilling Yellow stamp at auction in 1996, which at the time was the highest price ever paid for a single stamp, for which he was pictured (page 48) in the Guinness Book of Records (https://www.Guinness world records.com.//2002). That record was eclipsed in 2014 by the sale of the British Guiana 1c magenta.

== Early life ==
His early life was in Dublin, Ireland, where he started a stamp exchange scheme with school classmates at eight years of age. By 1958, this had become The Shamrock Stamp Club, a mail order sales business promoted by advertising in Mickey Mouse comics. Irish philately was his speciality; the first specialised stamp catalogue, Stamps of Ireland, debuted in 1964, and, in 1967, he held his first specialised Irish stamp auction, which took place on 10 February in Dublin. In 1968, he graduated with honors in both business administration and philosophy. When the Handbook of Irish Philately was published in 1968, Feldman presented a copy to the President of Ireland, Éamon de Valera.

By the 1970s, a growing stamp market led to a great increase in stamp prices; so much so, that Feldman states: "You just could not get enough stamps to sell." During this period he started David Feldman Ltd., became an auctioneer and philatelic author, and published the DF Newsletter, an Irish philatelic publication along with other specialised books. He also promoted three public stamp exhibitions in Dublin before becoming chairman of Stampa 1972, the first Irish National Stamp Exhibition. David Feldman was a member of the Philatelic Advisory Committee to the Irish Minister for Posts and Telegraphs, from 1975 to 1981, with Robson Lowe and other distinguished philatelists.

== Switzerland ==
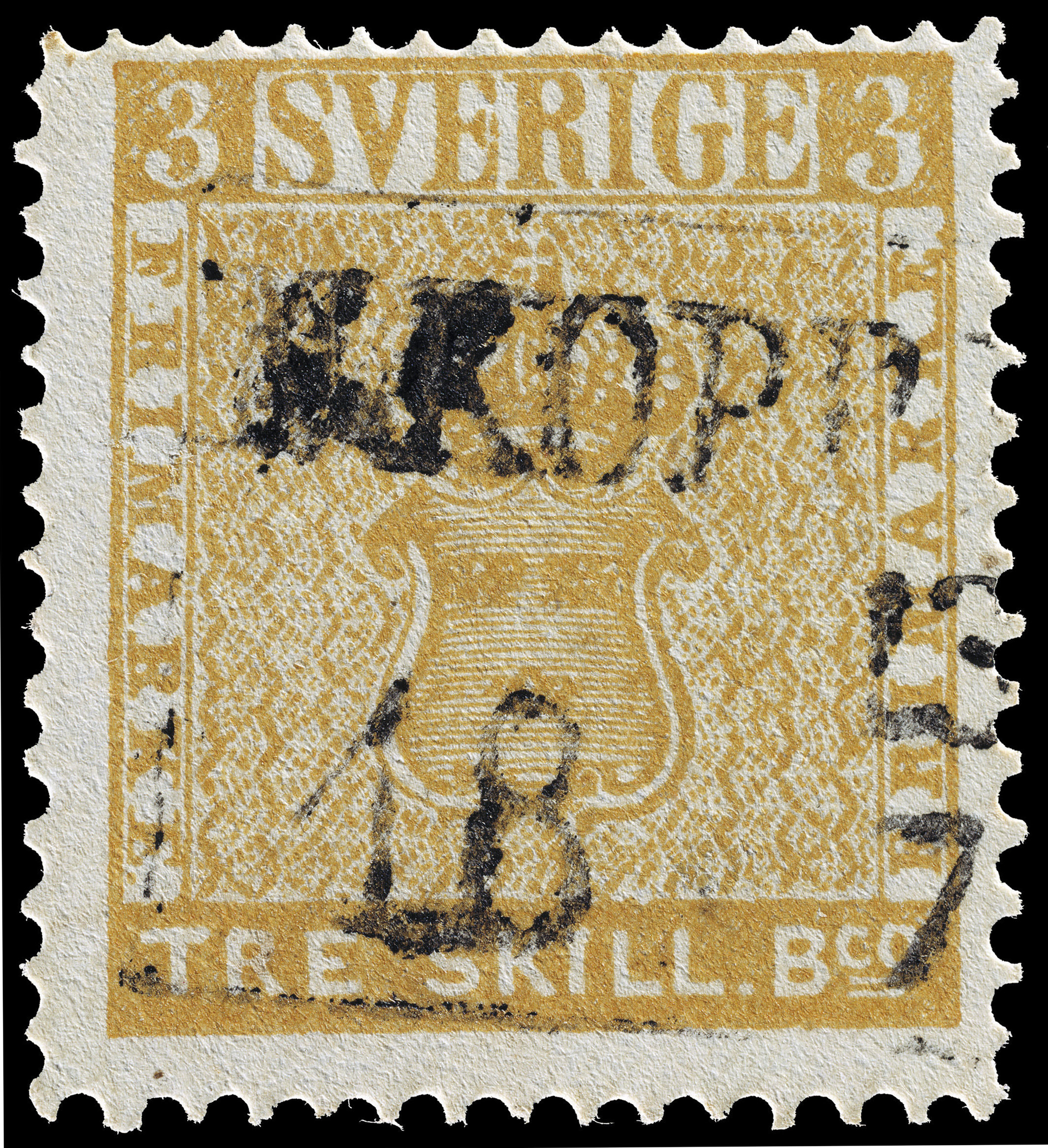
World record priced Treskilling Yellow auctioned for $2.3 million in 1996 by David Feldman

Later, having met a Swiss girl who was on a cycling holiday to Ireland, he moved to Switzerland in 1973 and they were married a year later. He has continued to operate as a stamp auctioneer and publisher since then, starting a new auction business and running his first auction there in 1976. Some record prices achieved by David Feldman have been for the Swedish Treskilling Yellow ($2.2 million in 1996), for which his photo appeared in the Guinness Book of World Records, the Mauritius Two Pence Blue ($1.4 million in 1993) stamps and the $1,000,000 for the Alexandria "Blue Boy" Postmaster's Provisional in 1981.

In 1987 Feldman joined with ex-Christie's President, Géza von Habsburg and others to form Habsburg Feldman SA. Headquartered in Geneva, Switzerland, it held major auctions in paintings, watches, jewellery, art-deco, art nouveau and objets d'arts in centres all over the world. Ranked as the world's third biggest auctioneer [by volume of sales], with Feldman as CEO, the company established world records selling a Patek Philippe watch "Le Calibre" at 5 million Swiss francs and "La Rhubarbe", a piece of Galle glass at 1.5 million Swiss francs in 1988. Feldman also established a new record for a painting by Marc Chagall at US$4.62 million in the same year. In 1990 Feldman left the company over differing views with his associates regarding business strategies.

In 1997, David Feldman was invited to sign the Irish Roll of Distinguished Philatelists for his support and contributions to Irish philately. Feldman auctioned off one of his personal collections in May 2003: The 'Emerald' Collection of Destination Mail of the World contained mail to and from Ireland dating from 1714 to 1913 accumulated over about forty years. In 2019 he was appointed life member and fellow of the Royal Philatelic Society, London.

In 2008 Feldman merged his company with Feldman Frey Philatelic Group, led by Markus Frey, a Zurich lawyer and banker. By 2012 Feldman had relinquished all his financial interest in the company to the Frey Group and to current management, and became Honorary chairman.

== The Isleworth Mona Lisa ==
In 2004 Feldman was mandated by Elizabeth Meyer to make research, scientific and physical examinations of her painting which had been known as the Isleworth Mona Lisa. In 2010, he formed, together with Markus Frey, Daniel Kohler and others, The Mona Lisa Foundation, a non-profit organisation, which absorbed decades of previous research concerning that painting, and initiated new expertises, scientific tests and physical examinations. The work culminated in the publication of 'Mona Lisa – Leonardo's Earlier Version', a 320-page volume published in 2012. The exact status of the painting, however, was debated by art historians. Since then several exhibitions, documentaries, and publications by independent experts with much recent evidence seem to confirm the foundation's findings.

== Family ==
David Feldman married Fabienne Marquart of Switzerland in 1974, now divorced. They have 6 children, four boys followed by two girls (adopted Thai sisters) Amiel David (b. 1979), Joel (b. 1981), Benjamin Boaz (b. 1984), Ruben Gabriel (b. 1986), Nalis (b. 1987), and Kritiya (b. 1989)

== Selected publications ==
- Feldman, David (1968). Handbook of Irish Philately. Dublin, Ireland: David Feldman Ltd & the Dolman Press Ltd.
- Feldman, David (1970). Stamps of Ireland, Price List. Dublin, Ireland: David Feldman Ltd.
- Feldman, David (1973). Ireland – Railway Letter Stamps – Price List. Dublin, Ireland: David Feldman Ltd.
- Feldman, David (c. 1975). The Revenue Stamps of Ireland. Dublin, Ireland: David Feldman Ltd.
- Feldman, David (1974). Stamps of Ireland, Illustrated Catalogue. Dublin, Ireland: David Feldman Ltd.
- Feldman, David; Kane, William (1975). Handbook of Irish Postal History to 1840. David Feldman Ltd, Dublin, Ireland. ISBN 0-9502619-1-2.
- Feldman, David (1976). Stamps of Ireland, Illustrated Catalogue. Dublin, Ireland: David Feldman Ltd.
