= Chalon =

Chalon may refer to:

== Culture ==
- Chalon people, a Native American tribe of California
- Chalon language, an Ohlone language spoken by the Chalon people

== Places ==
- Chalon, Isère, formerly Châlons, in France's Isère department
- Le Chalon, in the Drôme department
- Château-Chalon, in the Jura department
  - Château-Chalon AOC, its wine
- Charnay-lès-Chalon, in the Saône-et-Loire department
- Chalon-sur-Saône, in the Saône-et-Loire department
  - FC Chalon, a football club
  - RC Chalon, a rugby union club

== Persons ==
- Chalon (surname)
- House of Chalon, a French and Dutch noble house
- House of Chalon-Arlay
- Chalon head, series of postage stamps designed by Alfred Edward Chalon

== See also ==
- Châlons (disambiguation)
