= Châlons (disambiguation) =

Châlons may refer to:

== France ==
- Châlons-en-Champagne (formerly Châlons-sur-Marne), a town in the Marne department
  - Camp de Châlons, a military base used for shooting events in the 1924 Paris Summer Olympics
  - Roman Catholic Diocese of Châlons, with its seat in Châlons-en-Champagne
  - Battle of Châlons (274), fought between the Roman Empire and the Gallic Empire
  - Battle of the Catalaunian Plains (451), also called the Battle of Châlons, fought between the Huns and the Romans
  - CO Châlons, a defunct football club from the town
  - Communauté d'agglomération de Châlons-en-Champagne, communauté d’agglomération centred on the town
- Châlons-sur-Vesle, a village in the Marne department
- Châlons-du-Maine, village in the Mayenne department
- Chalon (formerly Châlons), a village in the Isère department

== See also ==
- Chalon (disambiguation)
