= Chalon (surname) =

Chalon is a surname, and may refer to:

- Alfred Edward Chalon (1780–1860), Swiss portrait painter
- Anna Chalon, French singer-songwriter
- Christina Chalon (1748–1808), Dutch artist
- Frédéric Chalon (fl. 1801–1821), French musician
- Henry Bernard Chalon (1770–1849), English painter and lithographer
- John James Chalon (1778–1854), Swiss painter
- Jean Chalon (born 1935), French writer, winner of the 1994 Prix Marcel Proust

Chalon's meaning is derived from Old English "chaloun", meaning blanket. The word comes from Châlons-sur-Marne, which was an industrial producer of blankets and is currently called Châlons-en-Champagne
