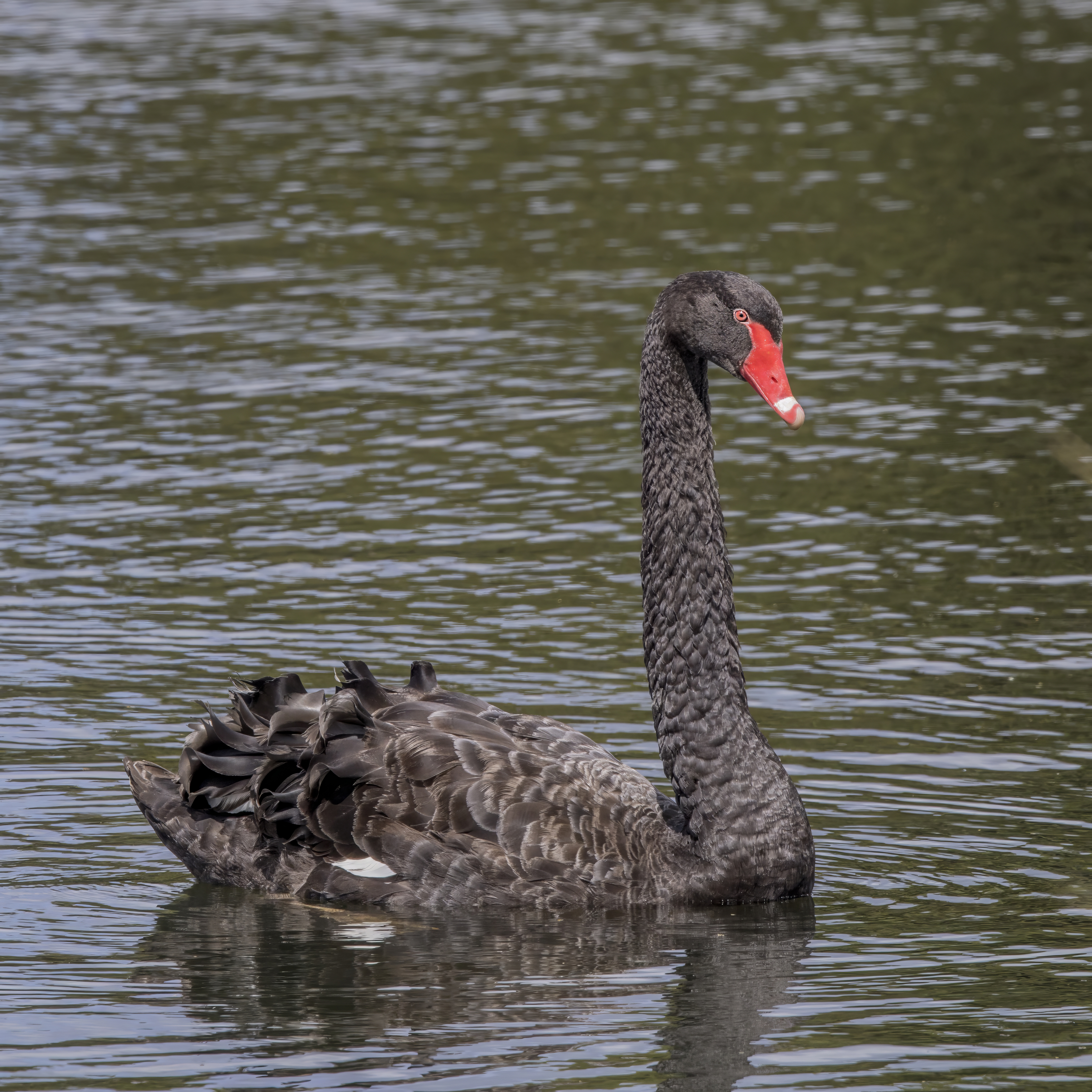
- In Tasmania

Conservation status
- Least Concern (IUCN 3.1)

Scientific classification
- Kingdom: Animalia
- Phylum: Chordata
- Class: Aves
- Order: Anseriformes
- Family: Anatidae
- Genus: Cygnus
- Species: C. atratus

Binomial name
- Cygnus atratus (Latham, 1790)
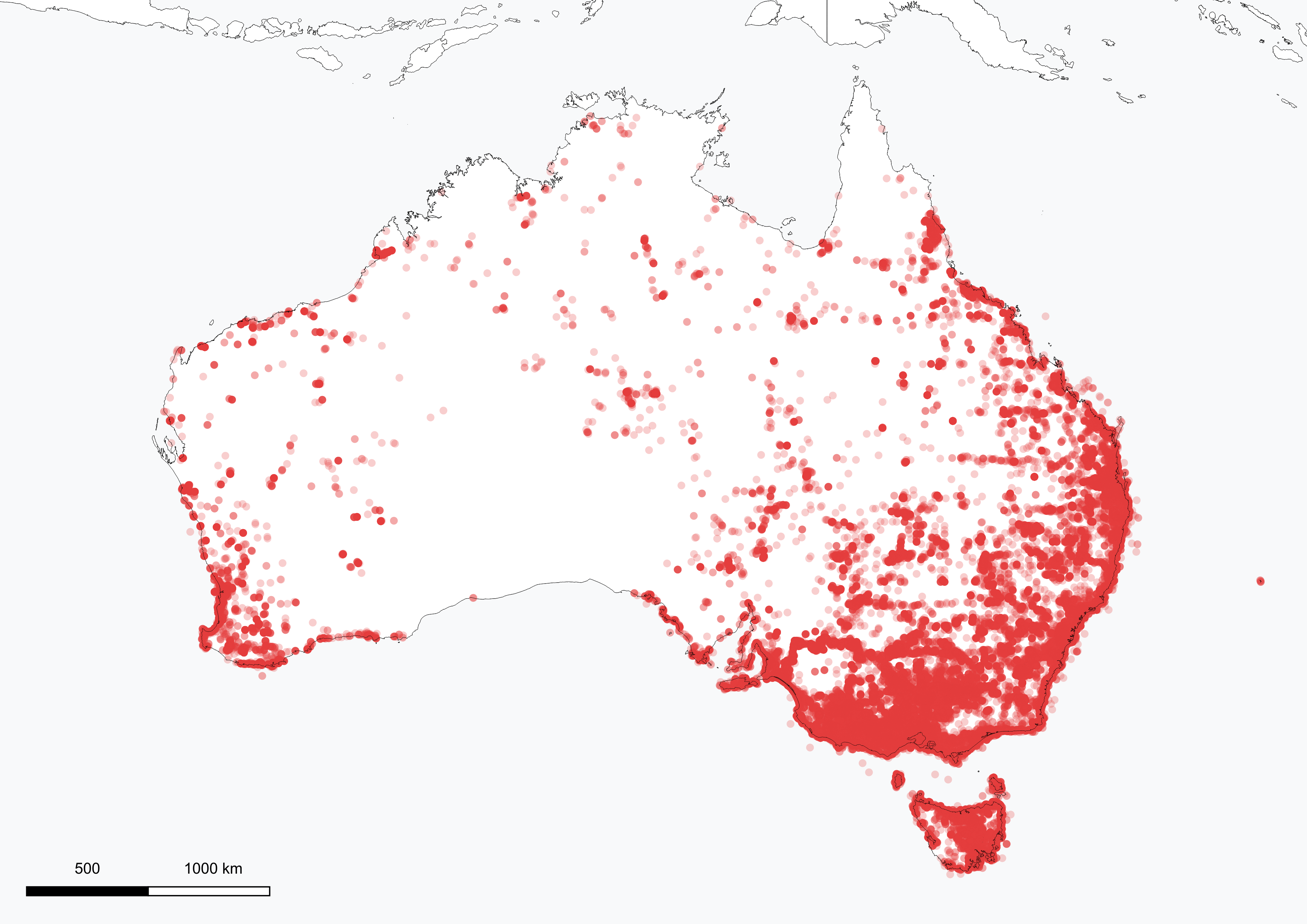
- Species distribution in Australia

Synonyms
- Anas atrata Latham, 1790; Chenopis atratus

Audio
- Call, in Ansons Bay, Tasmania, Australia

= Black swan =

Species of waterfowl

The black swan (Cygnus atratus) is a large waterbird, a species of swan which breeds mainly in the southeast and southwest regions of Australia. Within Australia, the black swan is nomadic, with erratic migration patterns dependent on climatic conditions. It is a large bird with black plumage and a red bill. It is a monogamous breeder, with both partners sharing incubation and cygnet-rearing duties.

Black swans can be found singly, or in loose companies numbering into the hundreds or even thousands. It is a popular bird in zoological gardens and bird collections, and escapees are sometimes seen outside their natural range. The black swan was introduced to various countries as an ornamental bird in the 1800s, but has managed to escape and form stable populations.

This bird is a regional symbol of both Western Australia, where it is native, and the English town of Dawlish, where it is an introduced species.

== Taxonomy ==
Described scientifically by English naturalist John Latham in 1790 as Anas atrata, the black swan was later placed into the genus Chenopis. In 1997, the species was placed in the genus Cygnus, in the subgenus Chenopis. The species is monotypic.

== Distribution and habitat ==
The black swan is common in the wetlands of southwestern and eastern Australia and adjacent coastal islands. In the south west its range encompasses an area between North West Cape, Cape Leeuwin and Eucla; while in the east it covers a large region bounded by the Atherton Tableland, the Eyre Peninsula and Tasmania, with the Murray–Darling basin supporting very large populations of black swans. It is uncommon in central and northern Australia.

The black swan's preferred habitat extends across fresh, brackish and salt water lakes, swamps and rivers with underwater and emergent vegetation for food and nesting materials. It also favours permanent wetlands, including ornamental lakes, but can also be found in flooded pastures and tidal mudflats, and occasionally on the open sea near islands or the shore.

The black swan was once thought to be sedentary, but is now known to be highly nomadic. There is no set migratory pattern, but rather opportunistic responses to either rainfall or drought. In high rainfall years, emigration occurs from the south west and south east into the interior, with a reverse migration from these heartlands in drier years. When rain does fall in the arid central regions, black swans will migrate to these areas to nest and raise their young. However, should dry conditions return before the young have been raised, the adult birds will abandon the nests and their eggs or cygnets and return to wetter areas.

The black swan, like many other water fowl, loses all its flight feathers at once when it moults after breeding and is unable to fly for about a month. During this time it will usually settle on large, open waters for safety.

The species has a large range, with figures between 1 and 10 million km^{2} given as the extent of occurrence. The current global population is estimated to be up to 500,000 individuals. No threat of extinction or significant decline in population has been identified with this numerous and widespread bird.

Black swans were first seen by Europeans in 1697, when Willem de Vlamingh's expedition explored the Swan River, Western Australia.

=== Introduced populations ===
==== New Zealand ====
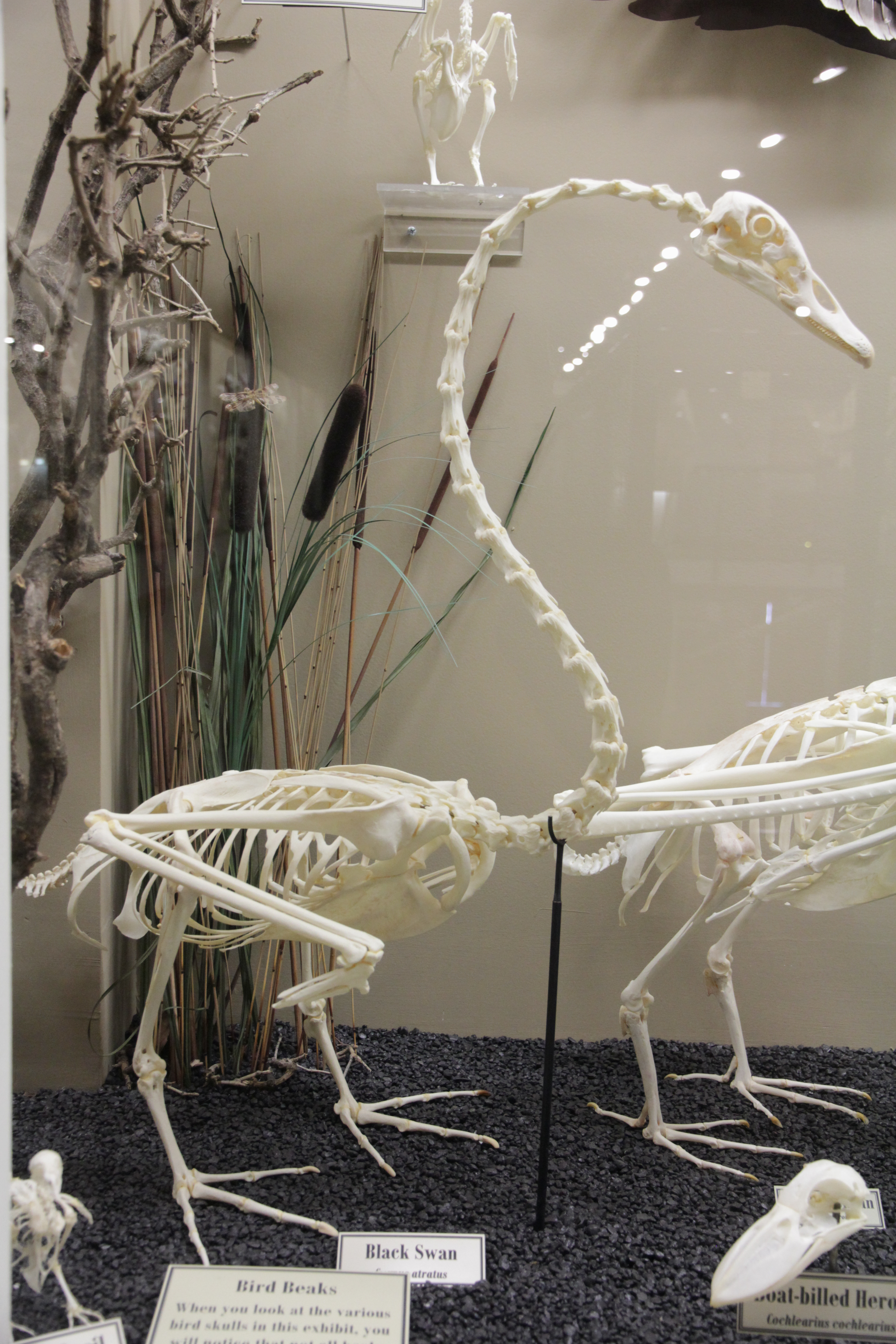
Skeleton, at the Museum of Osteology

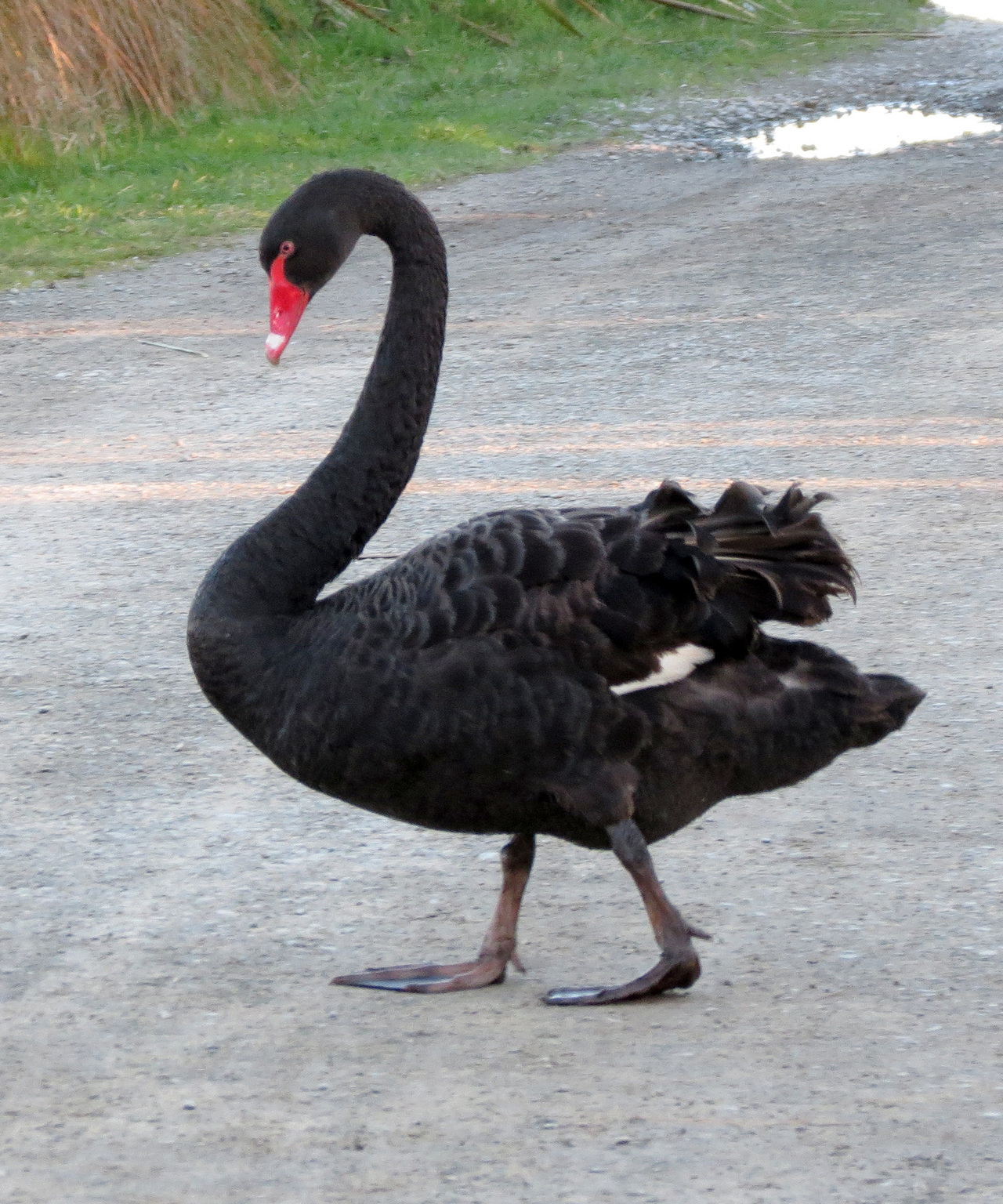
In New Zealand, where it is an introduced species

Before the arrival of the Māori in New Zealand, a related species of swan known as the New Zealand swan had developed there, but was apparently hunted to extinction. In 1864, the Australian black swan was introduced to New Zealand as an ornamental waterfowl and populations are now common on larger coastal or inland lakes, especially Rotorua Lakes, Lake Wairarapa, Lake Ellesmere / Te Waihora, and the Chatham Islands. Black swans have also naturally flown to New Zealand, although the present population appears to be largely descended from deliberate introductions.

==== Europe ====
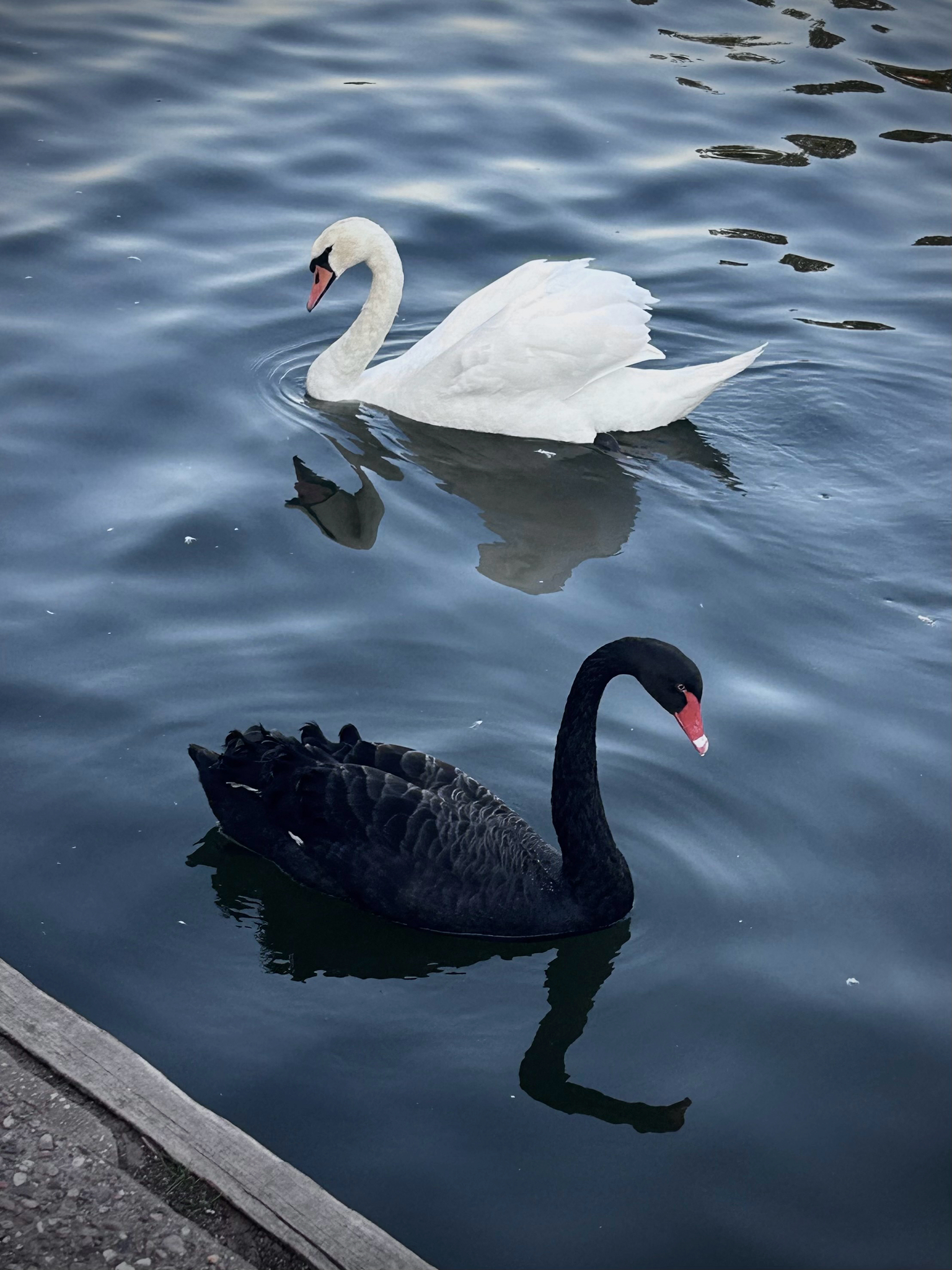
With a mute swan, in England

The black swan is also very popular as an ornamental waterbird in western Europe, especially Britain, and escapees are commonly reported. As yet, the population in Britain is not considered to be self-sustaining and so the species is not afforded admission to the official British List, but the Wildfowl and Wetlands Trust have recorded a maximum of nine breeding pairs in the UK in 2001, with an estimate of 43 feral birds in 2003–2004. A small population of black swans exists on the River Thames at Marlow, on the brook running through the small town of Dawlish in Devon, near the River Itchen, Hampshire, and the River Tees near Stockton-on-Tees. The Dawlish population is so well associated with the town that the bird has been the town's emblem for forty years.

==== Japan ====
There are also wild populations in Japan, having originally been imported during 1950–1960.

==== United States ====
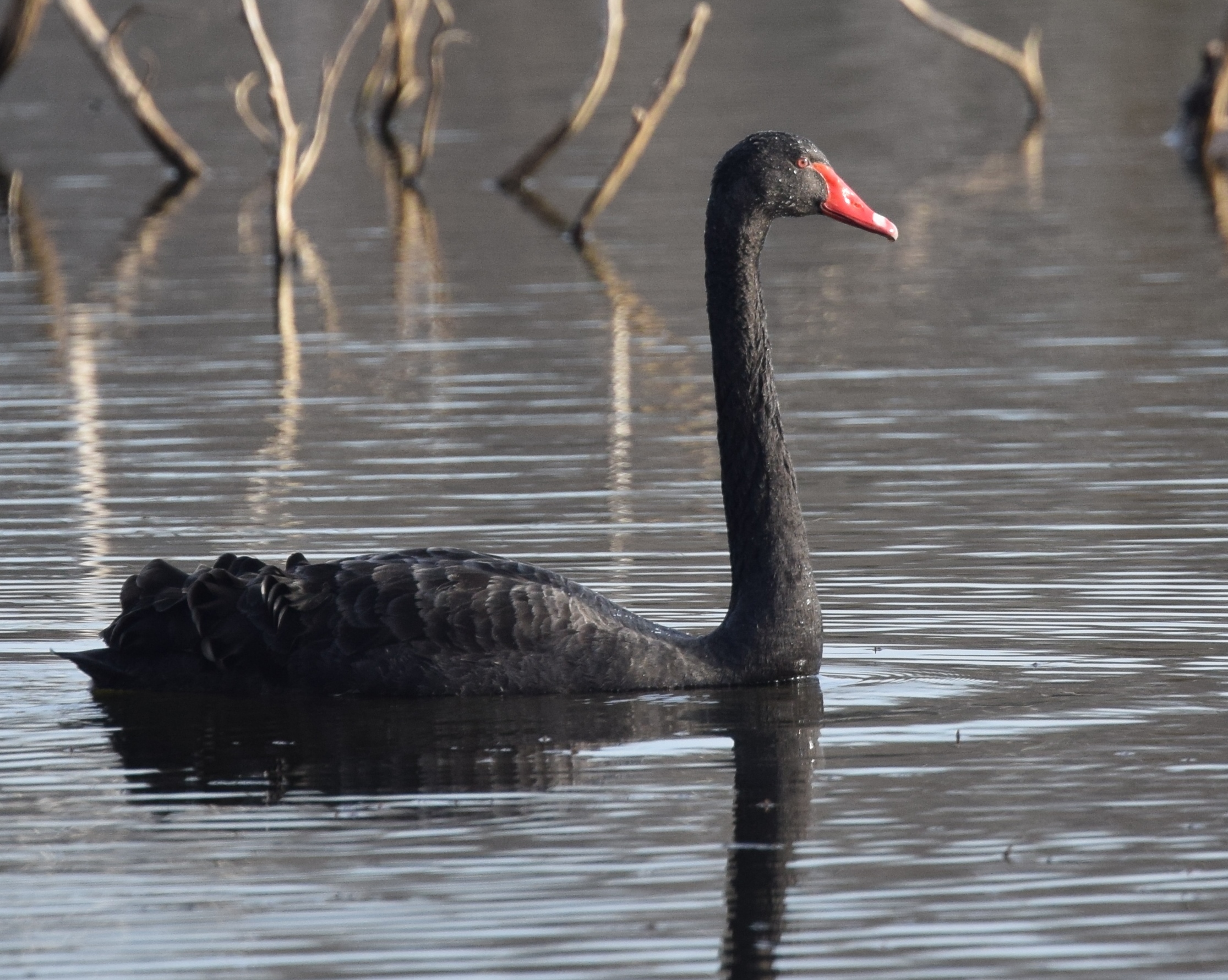
At Port Hudson Lake, Missouri (USA)

Black swans have been reported in Florida, but there is no evidence that they are breeding; persistent sightings may be due to continual releases or escapes. Orange County, California reported black swans in Lake Forest, Irvine and Newport Beach on 5 October 2020, and Santa Ana in December 2021 in the "Versailles on the Lake" apartment community. The "Lake Forest Keys" community bought the original swans about eight to ten years ago and since then there have been many births and gaggles from the original couple" according to a report in the Orange County Register. Black swans formerly resided in the vicinity of Lake Junaluska, a large lake in Waynesville, North Carolina.

==== Mainland China ====
Black swans can also be found in mainland China. In 2018, one group of swans was introduced to the Shenzhen University campus on an artificial lake in Guangdong Province.

== Description ==
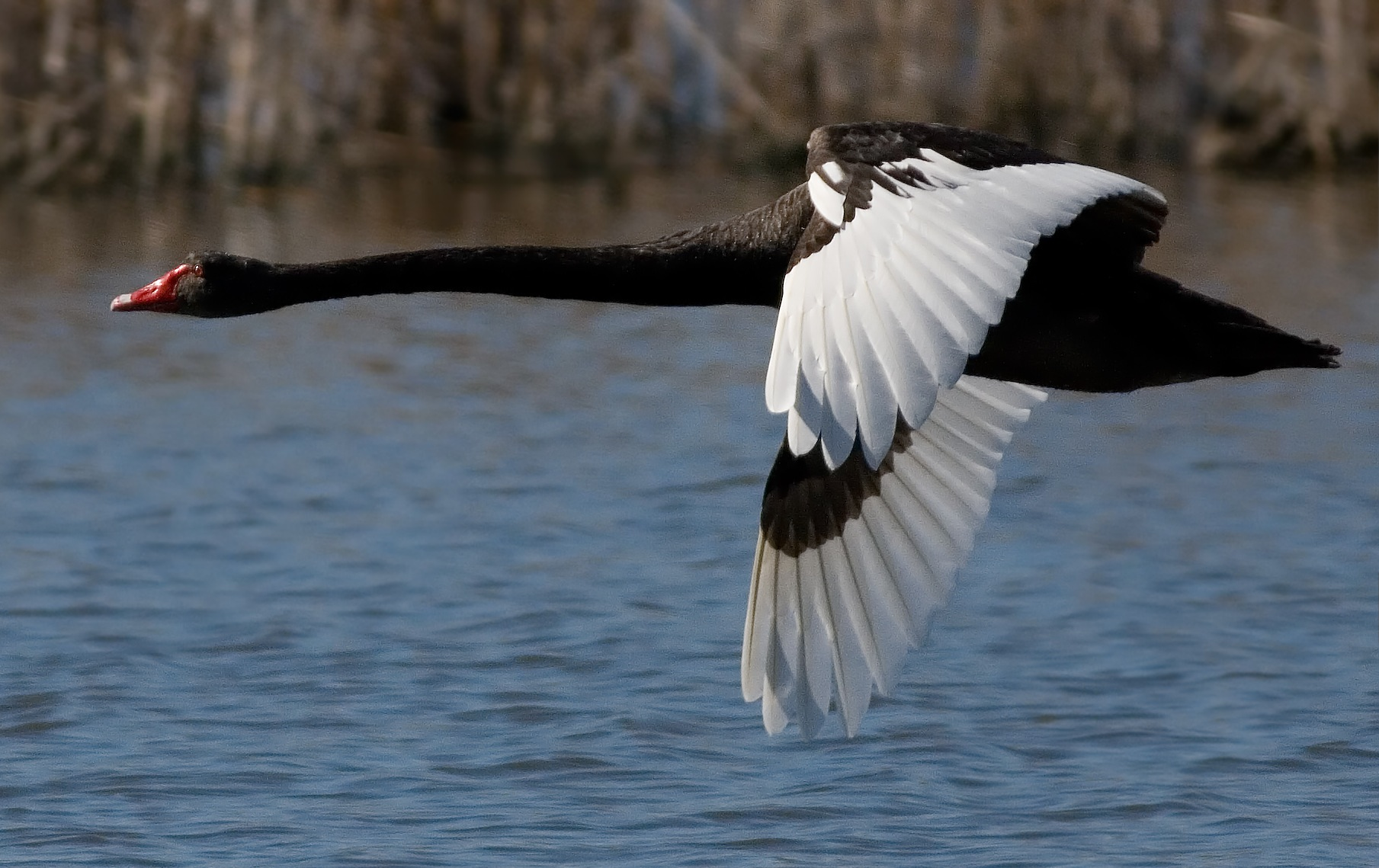
In flight, in Tasmania

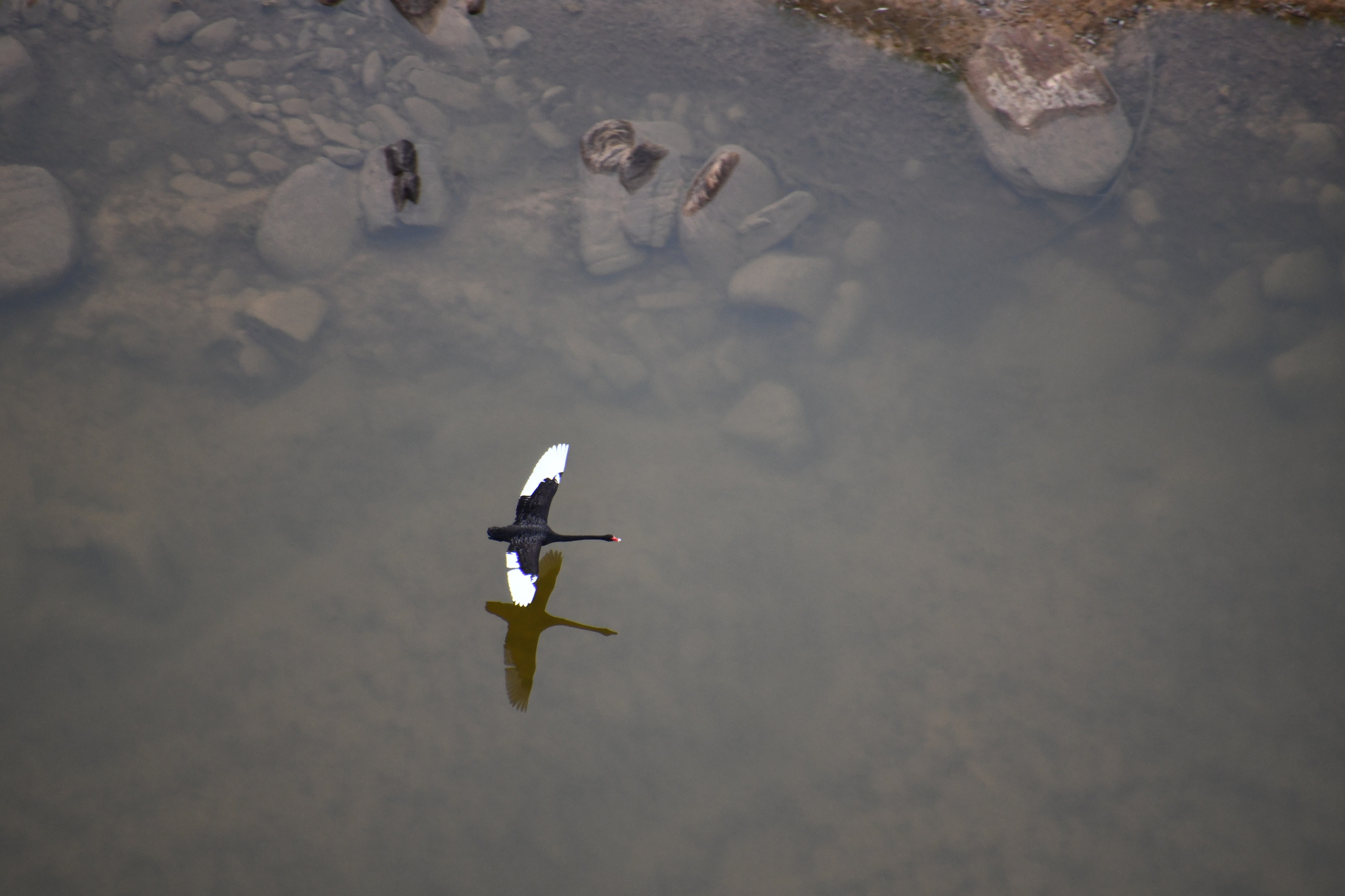
In flight as seen from above, in Western Australia

Black swans are black-feathered birds, with white flight feathers. The bill is bright red, with a pale bar and tip; and legs and feet are greyish-black. Cobs (males) are slightly larger than pens (females), with a longer and straighter bill. Cygnets (immature birds) are a greyish-brown with pale-edged feathers. Black swans have a proportionally longer neck than any other swan.

Mature black swans measure between 110 and 142 centimetres (43 and 56 in) in body length. Males can weigh 3.8–8.75 kg (8.4–19.3 lb), (Note: In one study, a scatter plot including the weight of male black swans indicated one individual over 9 kg, but without an exact figure.) while females weigh 3.7–7.2 kg (8.2–15.9 lb) Their wingspan is between 1.6 and 2 metres (5.2 and 6.6 ft).

The black swan utters a musical and far reaching bugle-like sound, called either on the water or in flight, as well as a range of softer crooning notes. It can also whistle, especially when disturbed while breeding and nesting.

When swimming, black swans hold their necks arched or erect and often carry their feathers or wings raised in an aggressive display. In flight, a wedge of black swans will form as a line or a V, with the individual birds flying strongly with undulating long necks, making whistling sounds with their wings and baying, bugling or trumpeting calls.

The black swan is unlike any other Australian bird, although in poor light and at long range it may be confused with a magpie goose in flight. However, the black swan can be distinguished by its much longer neck and slower wing beat.

One captive population of black swans in Lakeland, Florida has produced a few individuals which are a light mottled grey colour instead of black. White black swans are also known to exist; these individuals, which are leucistic, are believed to occur rarely in the wild.

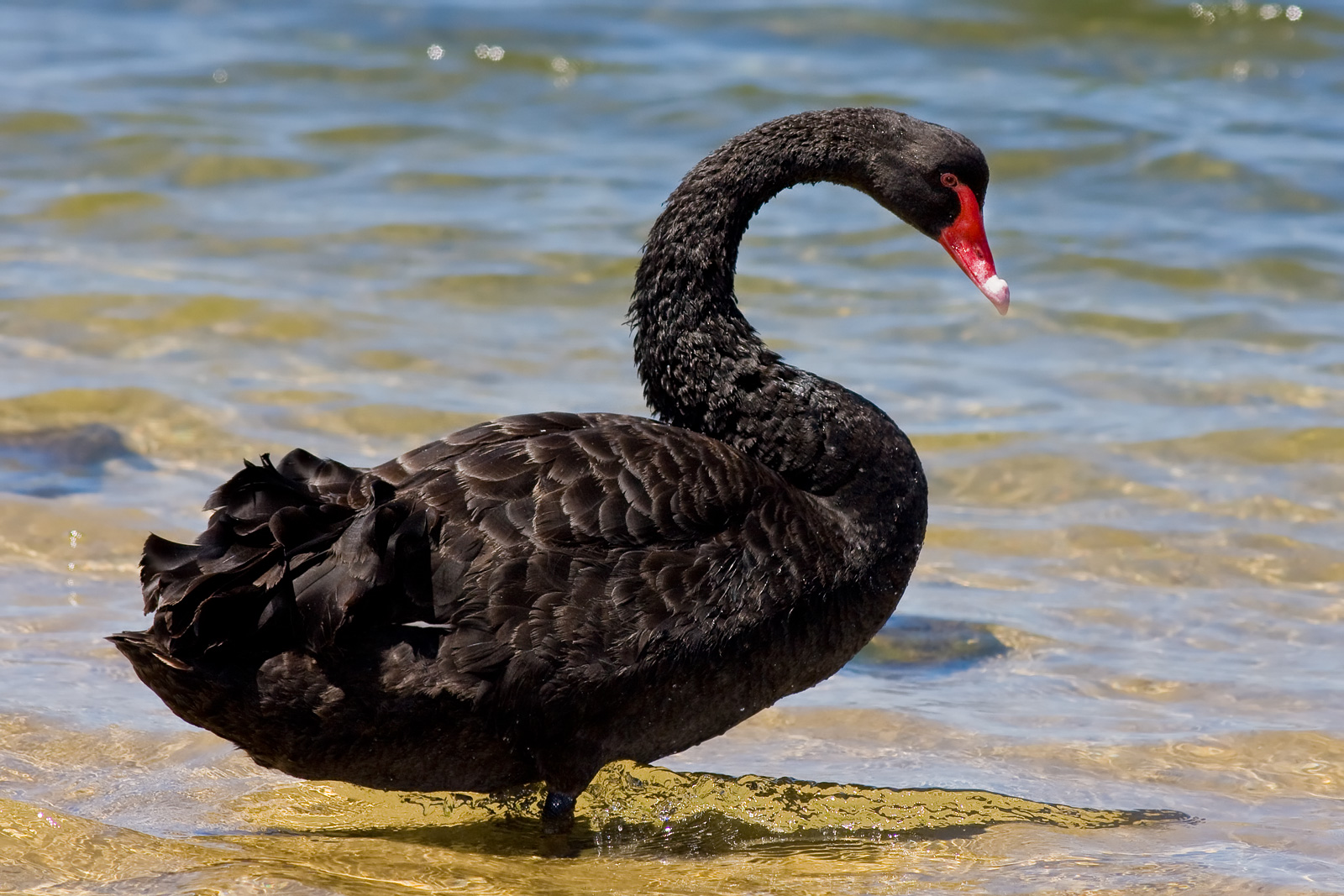
In Victoria, Australia

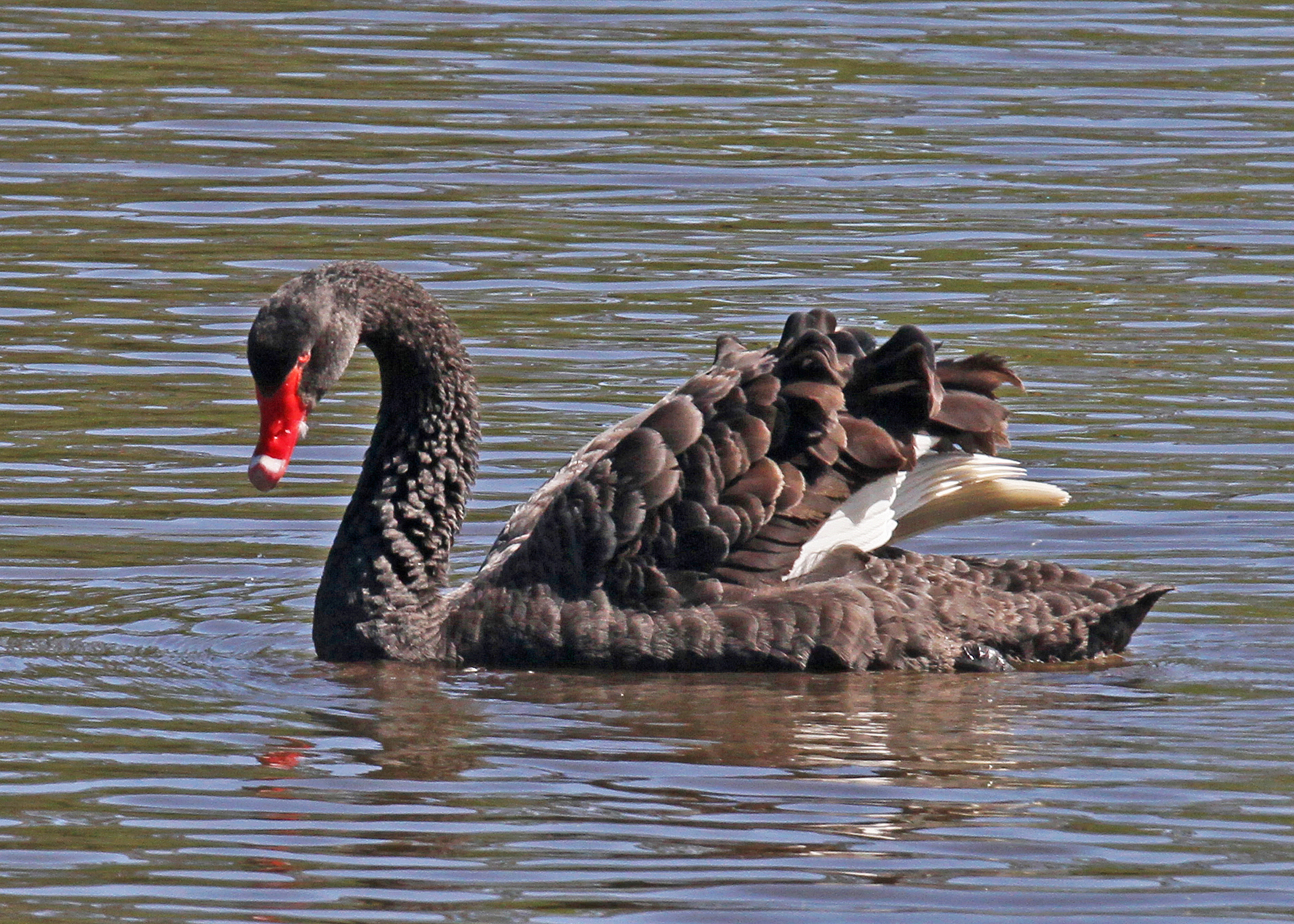
Near Devonport, Tasmania with wings raised in an aggressive display revealing white flight feathers

Black swans

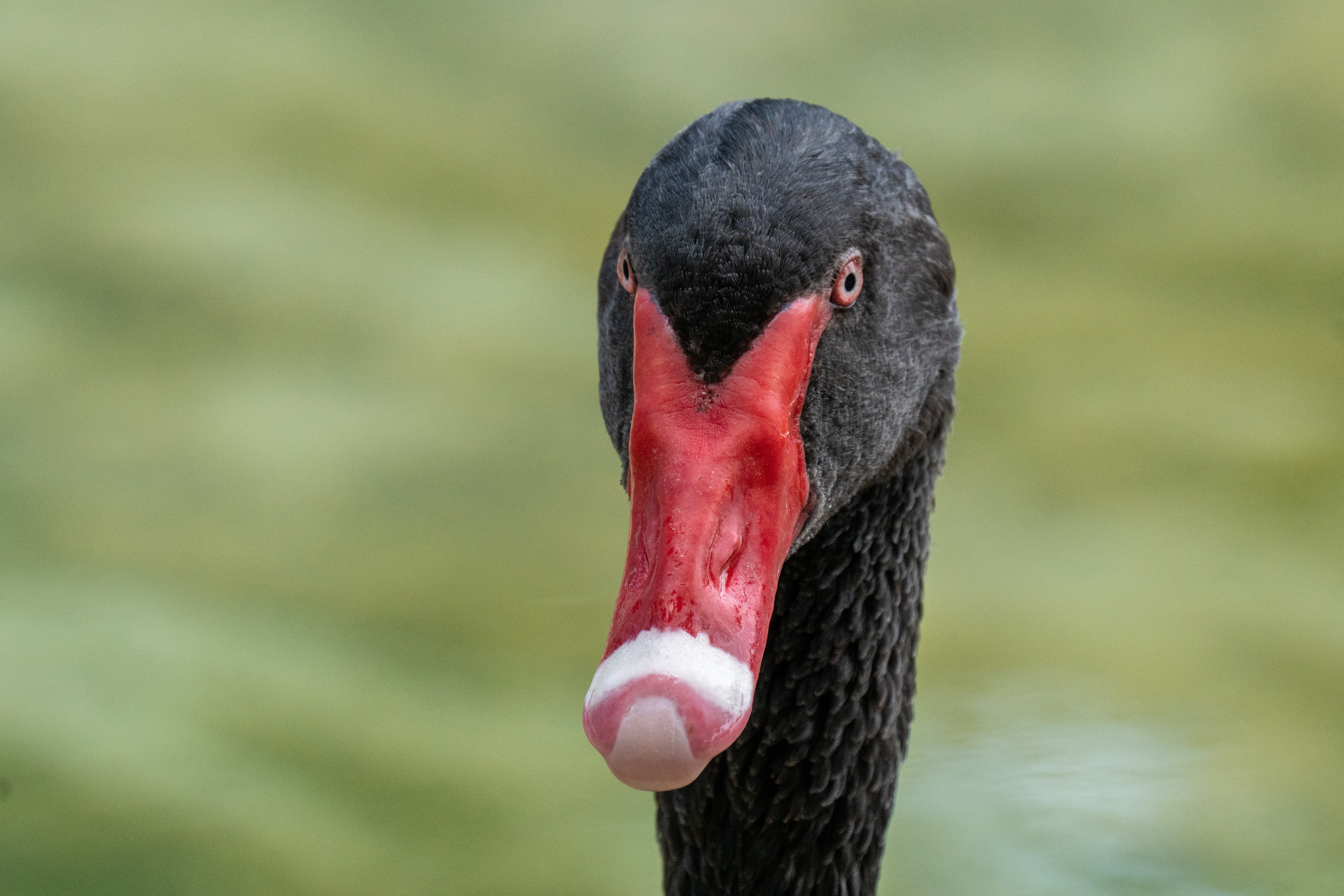
Closeup

== Behaviour ==
=== Diet and feeding ===
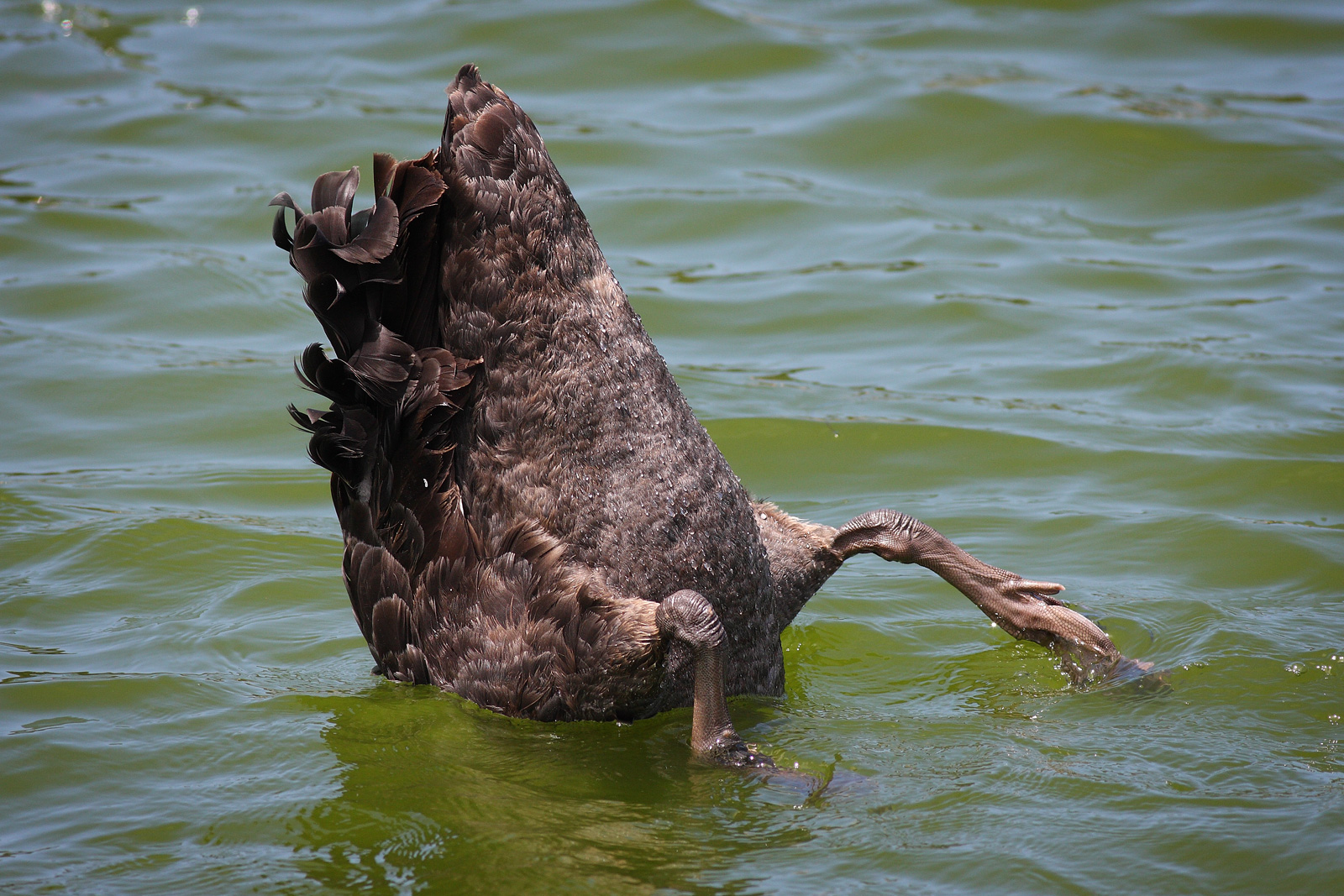
Upending to reach food, in Victoria, Australia

The black swan is almost exclusively herbivorous, and while there is some regional and seasonal variation, the diet is generally dominated by aquatic and marshland plants. In New South Wales the leaf of reedmace (genus Typha) is the most important food of birds in wetlands, followed by submerged algae and aquatic plants such as Vallisneria. In Queensland, aquatic plants such as Potamogeton, stoneworts, and algae are the dominant foods. The exact composition varies with water level; in flood situations where normal foods are out of reach black swans will feed on pasture plants on shore. The black swan feeds in a similar manner to other swans. When feeding in shallow water it will dip its head and neck under the water and it is able to keep its head flat against the bottom while keeping its body horizontal. In deeper water the swan up-ends to reach lower. Black swans are also able to filter feed at the water's surface.

=== Nesting and reproduction ===
Like other swans, the black swan is largely monogamous, pairing for life (about 6% divorce rate). Recent studies have shown that around a third of all broods exhibit extra-pair paternity. An estimated one-quarter of all pairings are homosexual, mostly between males. They steal nests, or form temporary threesomes with females to obtain eggs, driving away the female after she lays the eggs.

Generally, black swans in the Southern hemisphere nest in the wetter winter months (February to September), occasionally in large colonies. A black swan nest is essentially a large heap or mound of reeds, grasses and weeds between 1 and 1.5 metres (3–4 1/2 feet) in diameter and up to 1 metre high, in shallow water or on islands. A nest is reused every year, restored or rebuilt as needed. Both parents share the care of the nest. A typical clutch contains four to eight greenish-white eggs.

==== Egg Size ====
Out of a sample of 201 eggs, egg length was found to range from 9.8 to 11.82 cm (3.86 to 4.65 in), with a mean of 10.69 cm (4.21 in), while width ranged from 6.52 to 7.92 cm (2.57 to 3.12 in) and averaged 6.98 cm (2.75 in). Out of 49 eggs, weight ranged 262–347 g (9.2–12.2 oz) and averaged 299 g (10.5 oz). Extremes were found out of a sample of 2000 eggs, the largest was found to measure 13.68 cm × 7.98 cm (5.39 in × 3.14 in) in dimensions and weigh 496 g (17.5 oz), while the smallest egg measured 7.7 cm × 5.4 cm (3.0 in × 2.1 in) in dimensions.

==== Incubation and parental care ====
The eggs are incubated for about 35–40 days. Incubation begins after the laying of the last egg, to synchronise the hatching of the chicks. Prior to the commencement of incubation the parent will sit over the eggs without actually warming them. Both sexes incubate the eggs, with the female incubating at night. The change over between incubation periods is marked by ritualised displays by both sexes. If eggs accidentally roll out of the nest both sexes will retrieve the egg using the neck (in other swan species only the female performs this feat). Like all swans, black swans will aggressively defend their nests with their wings and beaks. After hatching, the cygnets are tended by the parents for about nine months until fledging. Cygnets may ride on their parent's back for longer trips into deeper water, but black swans undertake this behaviour less frequently than mute and black-necked swans.

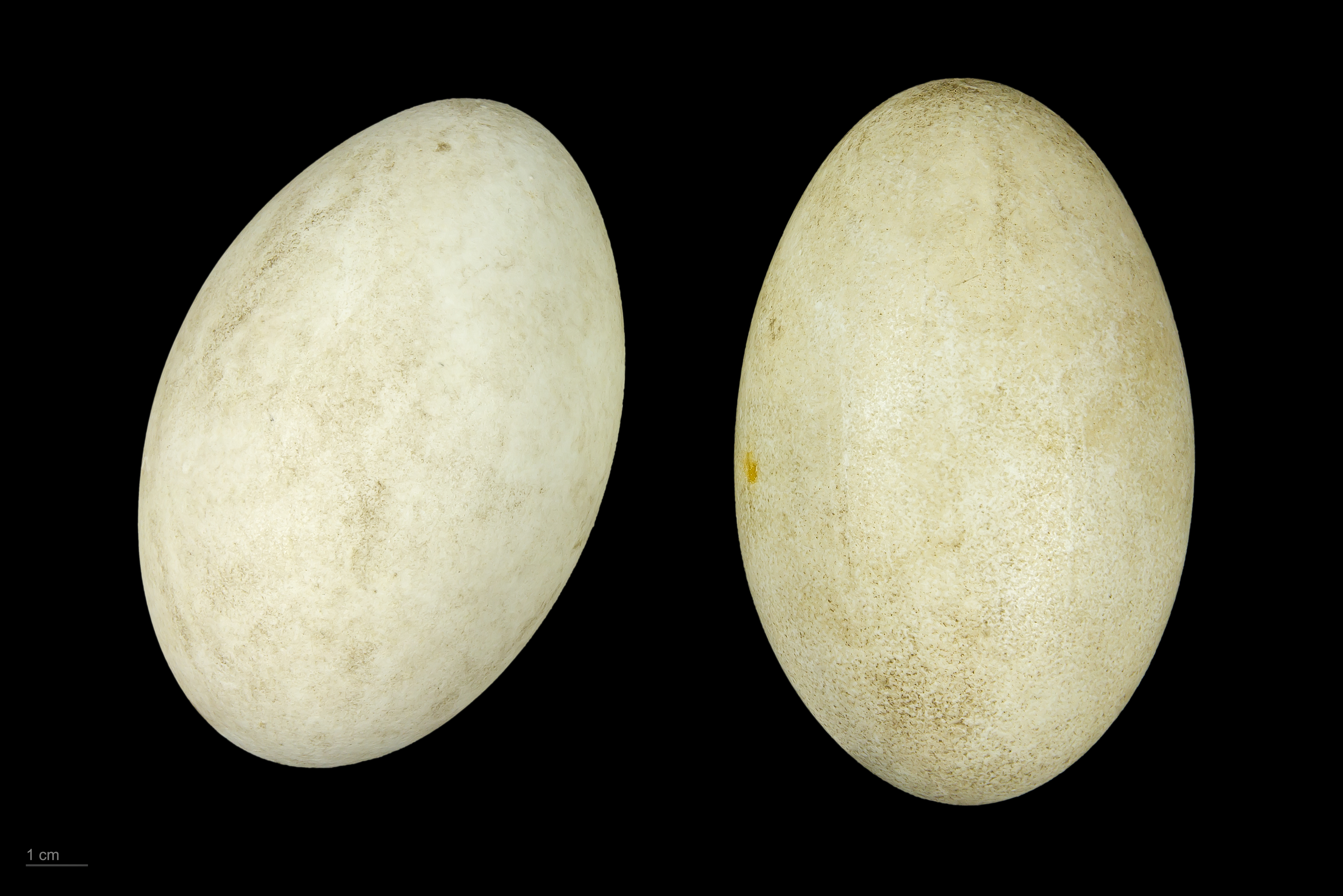
Eggs – MHNT

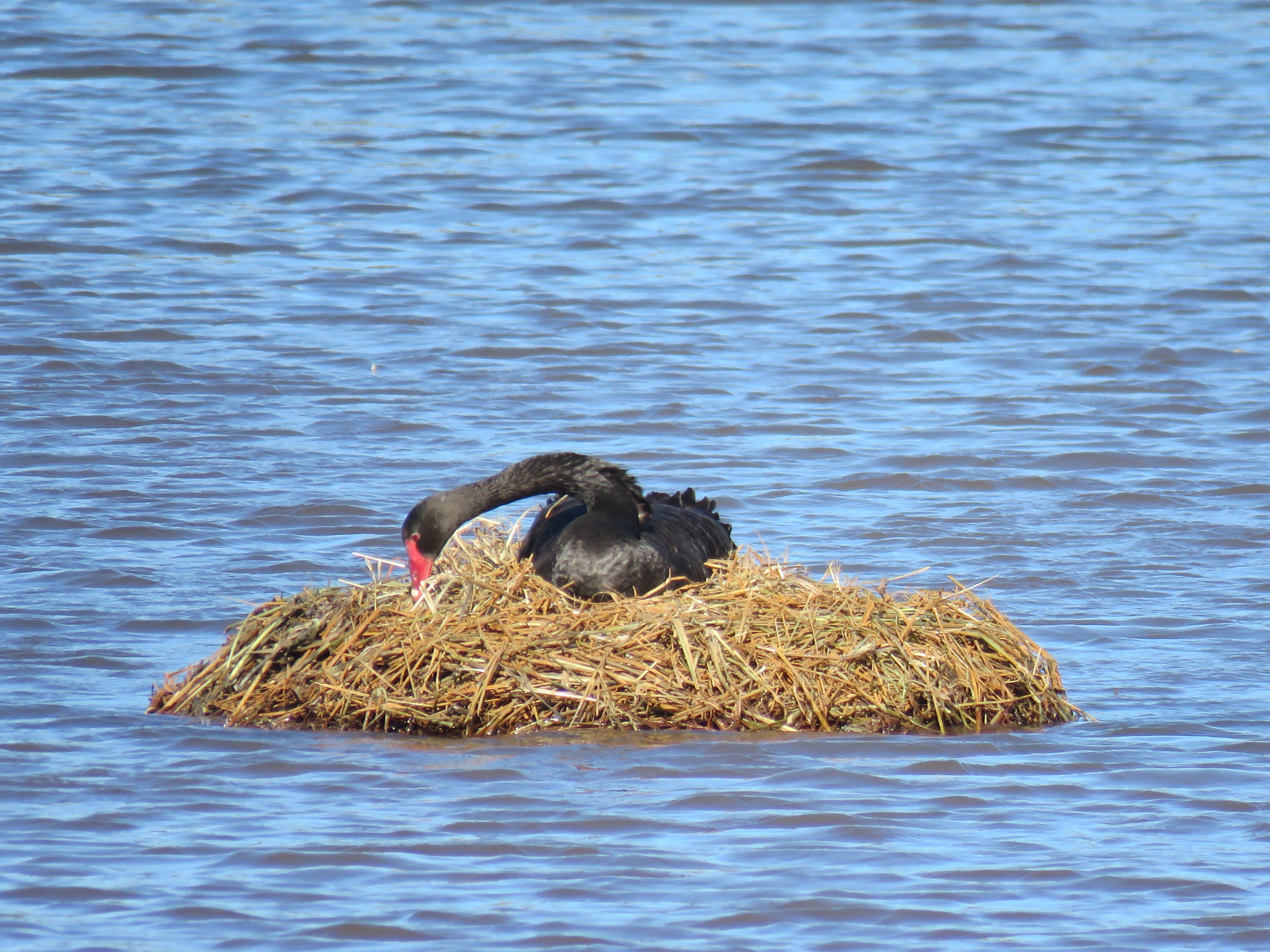
Nest at Booragoon Lake

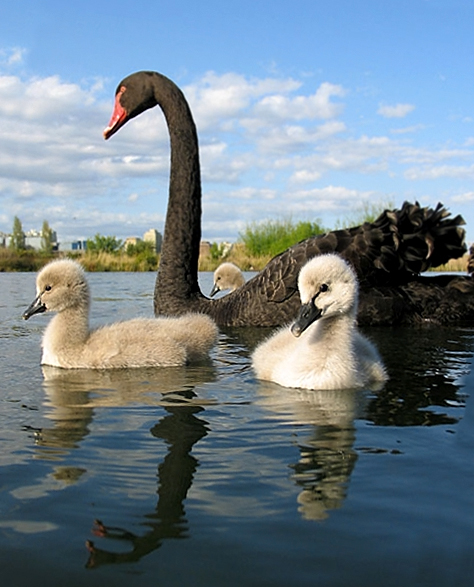
Parent with young cygnets in Australia

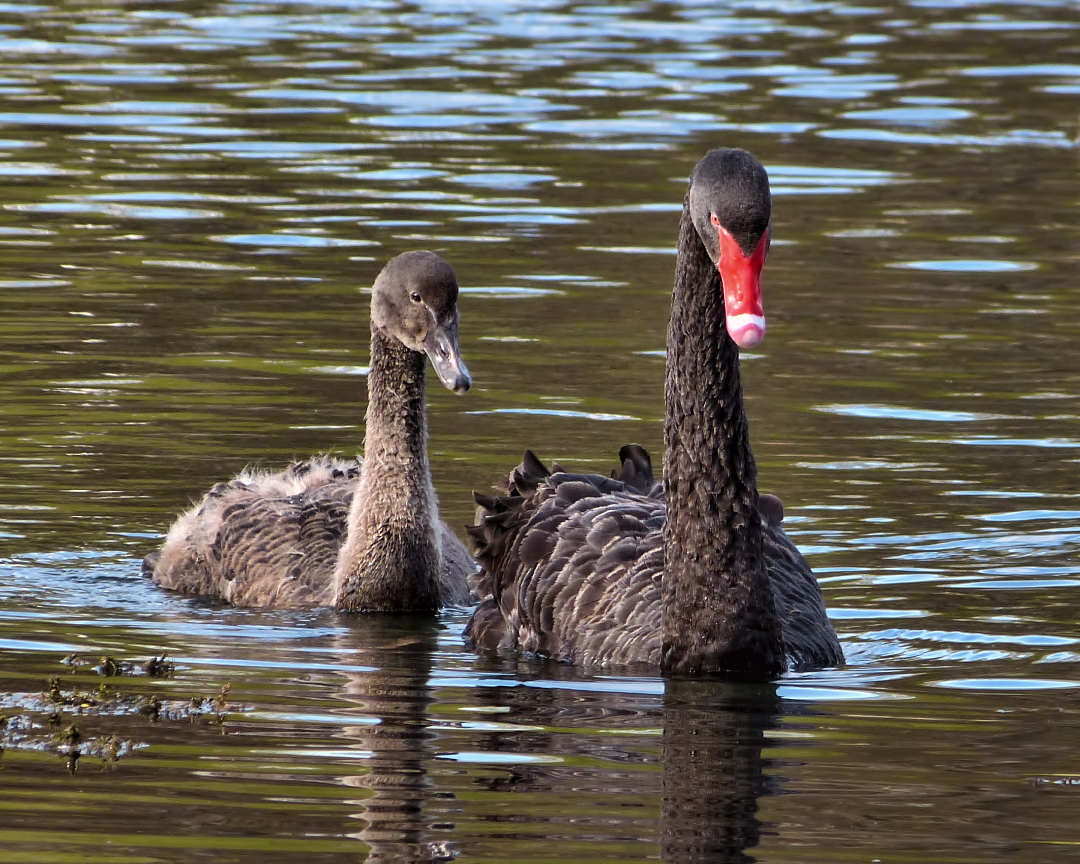
Parent with an older cygnet, in New Zealand

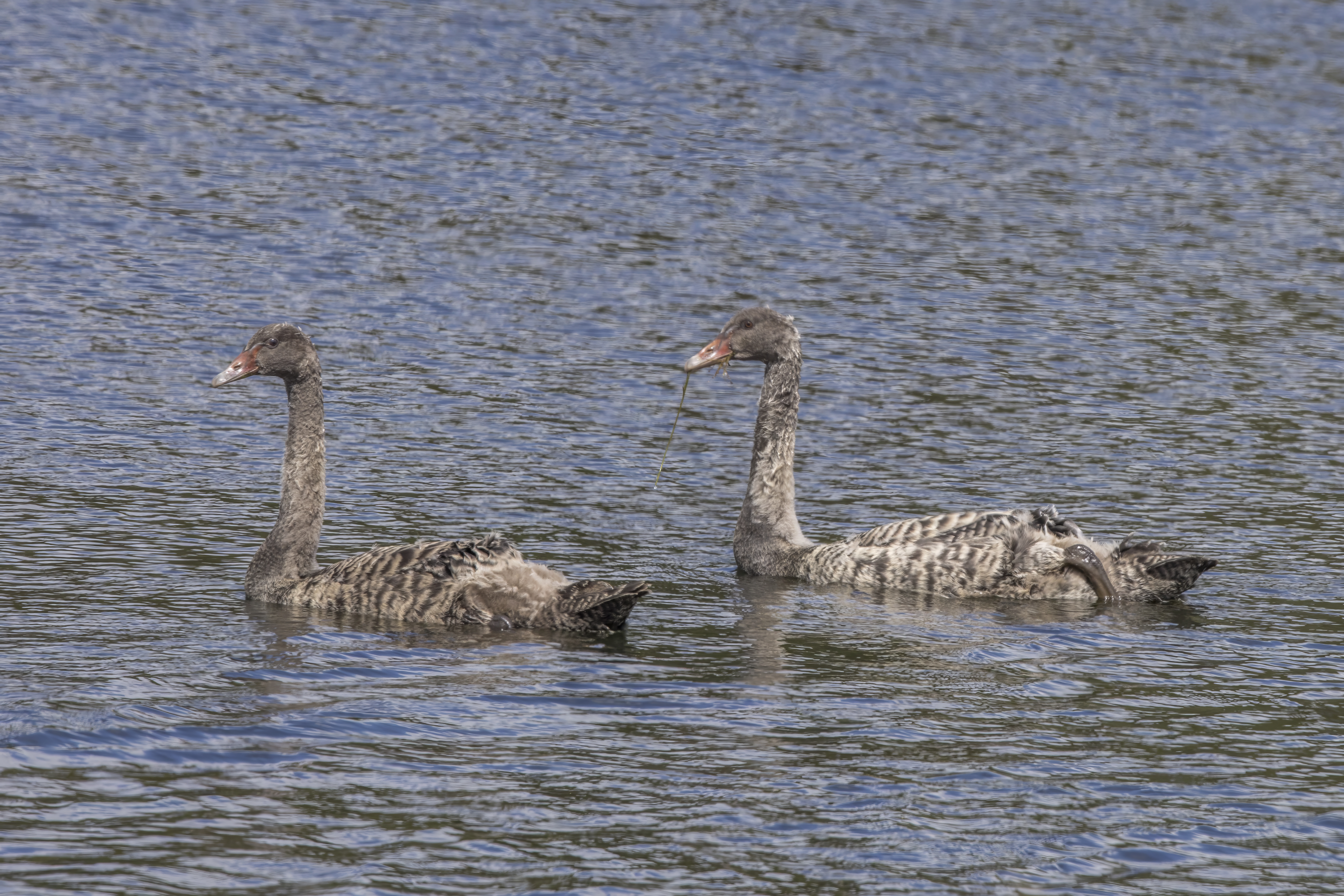
Older cygnets, Tasmania

== Relationship with humans ==
=== Indigenous Australians ===
In the Noongar language – spoken across southern Western Australia – the black swan is kuljak, kooldjak (Swan River and South West regions) or gooldjak (south coast); it is also sometimes known as maali in language schools.

The Teen Toomele Menennye people of Tasmania call the black swan pickerdar.

=== Non-indigenous cultures ===
Even before its existence became known to people elsewhere, European cultures used a then-mythological "black swan" as a symbolic or metaphorical literary or artistic device, in contrast to the well-known white mute swan.

In 1697, Dutch explorer Willem de Vlamingh made the first written description of the species black swans.

The state flag of Western Australia was officially adopted in 1870 and modified slightly in 1953.

The black swan's role in Australian heraldry and culture extends to the first founding of the colonies in the 18th and early 19th centuries. It has often been equated with antipodean identity, indicating "Australianness" in contrast to the white swan of the northern hemisphere.

An early postage stamp design – the sole stamp used in Western Australia from 1854 to 1902 – featured the swan and was known as the "Black Swan". From 1870, the black swan featured prominently on the flag of Western Australia; following self-government it became the emblem and official bird of Western Australia; it also appears in the coat of arms and other iconography of the state's institutions.

== Conservation ==
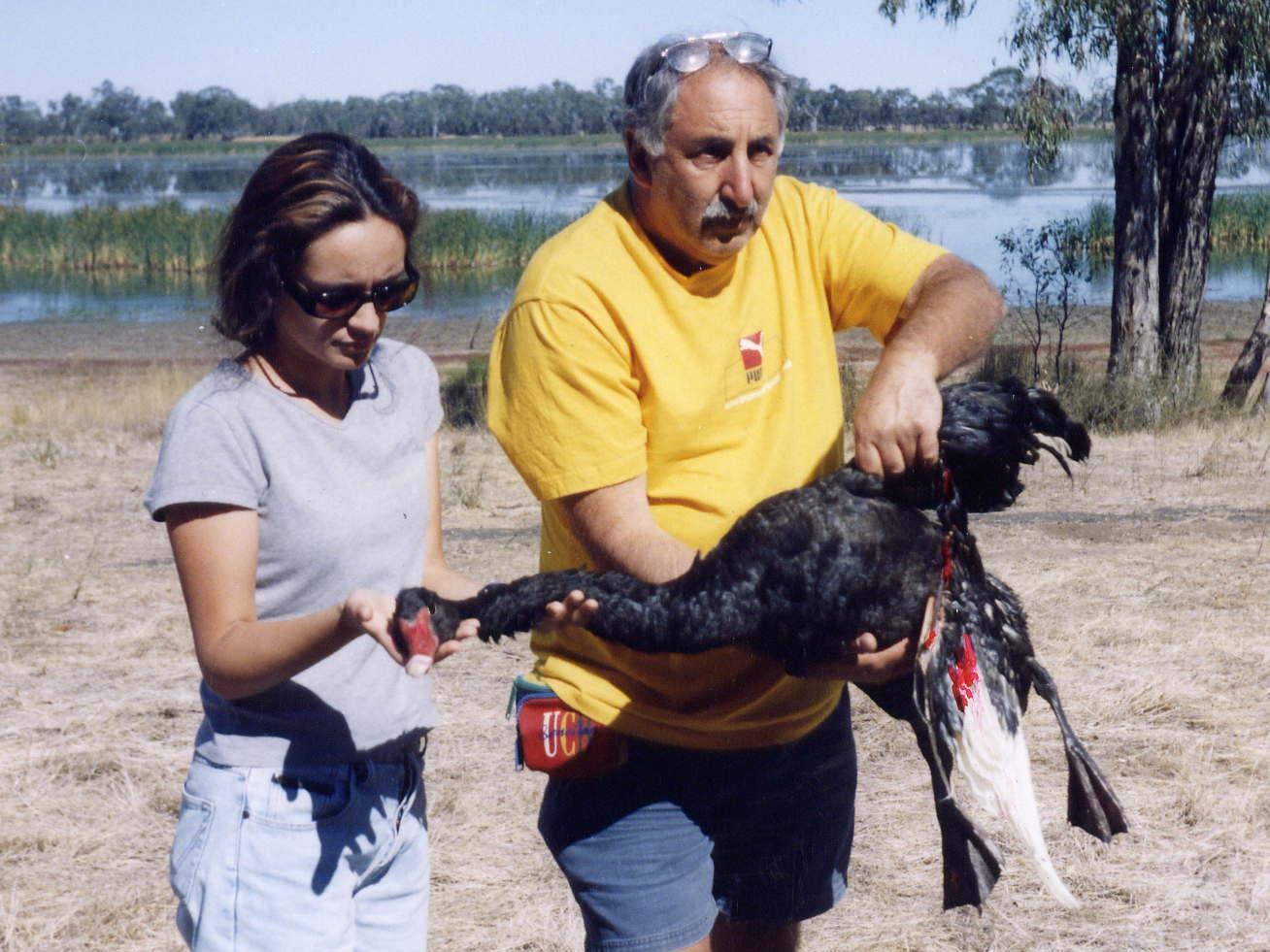
Rescuers with illegally shot black swan at Leaghur State Park.

The black swan is protected in New South Wales, Australia under the National Parks and Wildlife Act 1974 (s.5). The Black Swan is fully protected in all states and territories of Australia and must not be shot. It is evaluated as Least Concern on the IUCN Red List of Threatened Species.

== See also ==
- Black swan theory, a theory about outlier events (such as Europeans discovering a black swan)
- List of Latin phrases (R): rara avis in terris nigroque simillima cygno ("a rare bird in the lands, and very like a black swan") Juvenal, Satires, VI
