= Leaghur =

- Town
- Coordinates: 35°58′06″S 143°46′41″E
- Country: Australia
- State: Victoria
- LGA: Shire of Loddon

Government
  - State electorate: Murray Plains
  - Federal division: Mallee

Population
  - Total: 20 (2021 census)
- Postcode: 3537

Leaghur is a locality in the Shire of Loddon, Victoria, Australia. At the 2021 census, Leaghur had a population of 20.

Leaghur State Park is located in Leaghur.
