= William Humphrys =

- Born: c. 1794
- Died: 21 January, 1865 (aged 70–71)
- Occupation: Engraver

William Humphrys (c. 1794 – 21 January 1865) was an engraver of pictures, book illustrations and postage stamps.

Humphrys was born in Dublin. At an early age he moved to the United States where he studied engraving techniques under George Murray in Philadelphia. He began his career as engraver in 1815 and was involved in the engraving of vignettes for bank notes and engravings for book illustrations. The illustrations in the books by poets Bryant and Longfellow were the work of Humphrys.

He moved to England in 1823 where he worked on book illustrations for individual publishers. He then returned to the United States in 1843. Two years later he moved to Dublin to engrave "The Reading Magdalene" for the Royal Irish Art Union.

Melville states that he did the engraving for the United States stamp with the portrait of Washington. The Art of the Print webpage seems to put the engraving of the stamp before 1823. In the book by Fielding there is an undated reference to a book illustration by Humphrys called "Early days of Washington". In a report in The New York Times of 18 June 1922 A Hatfield Jr is quoted from his book "There are indications which lead me to the opinion that the engraver was no other than that gifted British artist William Humphrys .... in his obituary notice in The Art Journal (1865) it is stated that he engraved the portrait of Washington for United States stamps. This might have referred to the first Government issue of 1847, but, if so, the same printers printed the 1845 New York stamps and the 1847 United States Government issue and may have employed the same engraver." It should be remembered that Humphrys moved to Dublin in 1845.

He then came to England and was employed by Perkins, Bacon & Co. During his period of employment by Perkins Bacon he was responsible for the engraving of many of the classic stamps. At that time Perkins Bacon had the contract to produce stamps for the United Kingdom and for the many British possessions around the world. Humphrys engraved the head of Columbus for the first stamps of Chile. In 1854 he was given the task of re-engraving the Queen’s Head for the line-engraved 1d red-brown. The die he produced is known to philatelists as Die II or “Humphrys’s Retouch”.

Some of the stamps that were engraved by William Humphrys are as follows:

- Cape of Good Hope – he engraved the die for the first issue (triangulars).
- Ceylon.
- New Zealand – he engraved the first stamps, known as the Full Face Queens or Chalons, including the central vignette.
- Van Diemen's Land, Tasmania – he engraved their early stamps, including a new larger vignette, working from a Cousins engraving and a watercolour by Edward Henry Corbould.
- Queensland – reusing the large Chalon head from Van Diemen's Land, he engraved the dies for the first stamps used from 1860 to 1881
- St Helena.
- South Australia - he engraved the dies for the first stamps issued in 1855
- Western Australia - he engraved the dies for the first stamps, the famous Black Swan, issued in 1854

He gave up engraving and became an accountant to Novello & Co, typographical music and general printers, of London. In ill-health Humphrys went to Italy to recuperate. He had been invited by Alfred Novello, son of the founder of the company Vincent Novello, to the Villa Novello in Genoa. On 21 January 1865, while he was still at the villa, he died aged seventy-one.
