= Black Swan (stamp) =

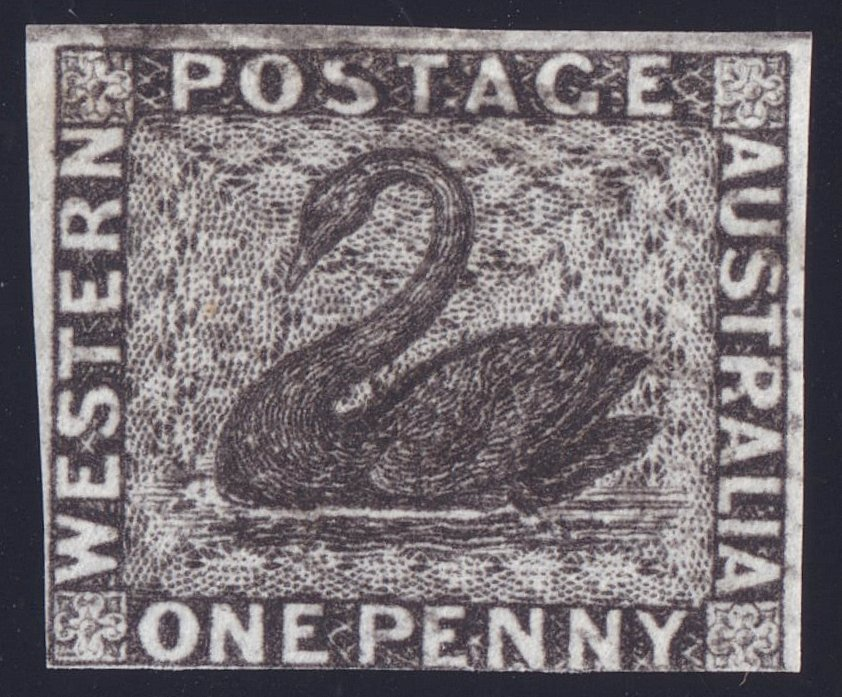
- Country of issue: Western Australia
- Country of production: Great Britain
- Engraver: William Humphrys
- Printer: Perkins Bacon
- Perforation: imperforate
- Depicts: black swan
- No. in existence: 14 or 15 recorded
- Face value: One penny

The Black Swan is the first postage stamp issued by the British colony of Western Australia in 1854. It illustrates a black swan, a typical Australian animal at the time and was the only image used on Western Australian stamps until 1902.

== Description ==
In 1854, the one penny denominated stamp was issued imperforate. It was engraved by William Humphrys and printed in London in 1854 by Perkins Bacon.

== Later issues ==
The later values in the series were produced in lithography by Horace Samson in Perth.

Western Australia only issued swan stamps until the creation of the Commonwealth of Australia in 1912, except for a few stamps of Queen Victoria issued in 1902. The reprints were also lithographed in the colony. In 1912, the main value of the series was overprinted One Penny to be valid for use throughout Australia.

The watermark on all the colony's stamps featured the silhouette of the swan until 1862.

In thematic philately, the Black Swan is the first stamp of the bird topic.

== Varieties of the series ==
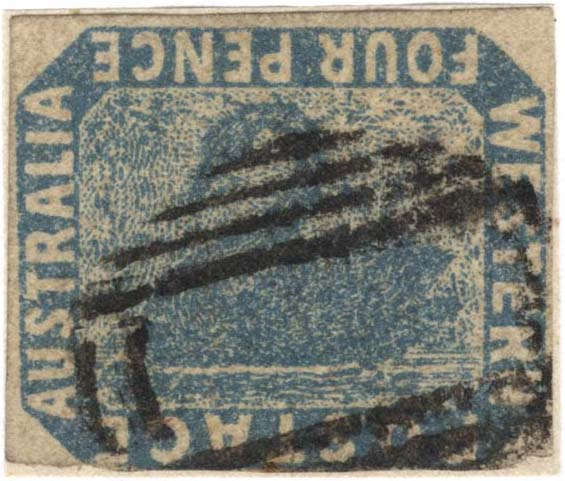
The Inverted Swan variety on the 4 pence blue

The 1855 4 pence blue (4d), of the Western Australia's swan series of stamps, this was the first invert error, where the frame and center are inverted in relation to one another.

In January 1855, a year after the first series was issued, Alfred Hillman took the printing plates from the archives to make new 4 pence stamps. Two of the plates were damaged and were replaced, but when they were reassembled one of the cliches was placed inverted on the plate.

Before the error was noticed 97 sheets of 60 inverted stamps were produced before Hillmann corrected the error.

Fourteen of fifteen copies of this error are recorded, all of which are cancelled. One is the Royal Philatelic Collection.

A stamp on a stamp was issued by Australia Post, that featured the Black Swan stamp. Firstly in 1929 for the centenary of the colony of Western Australia and again in 1954 for the centenary of the first Western Australian stamp.
