= Chalon head =

Postage stamp featuring Queen Victoria

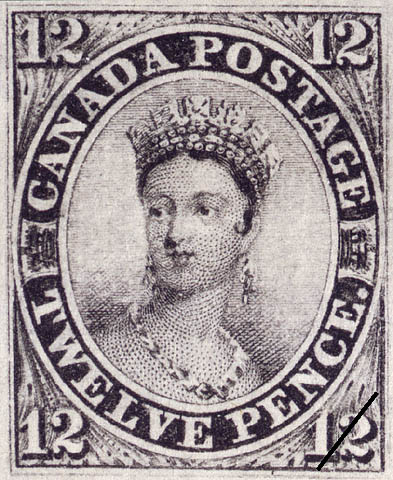
1851 Chalon head stamp of Queen Victoria issued by Canada

The Chalon Head is the name of a number of postage stamp series whose illustration was inspired by a portrait of Queen Victoria by Alfred Edward Chalon (1780–1860).

These stamps, printed in New York City for the Canadian colonies, and by Perkins, Bacon and Company in London, were issued in many British colonies from the 1850s until 1912 in Queensland. In chronological order, they were released in the Province of Canada in 1851, Nova Scotia in 1853, Tasmania and New Zealand in 1855, The Bahamas and Natal in 1859, Grenada, New Brunswick and Queensland in 1860, and in 1870 in Prince Edward Island.

Because these are some of the world's first stamps or the first stamps to bear these colonies' names, the Chalon series are objects of many studies and collections.

== Description ==
=== Original portrait ===
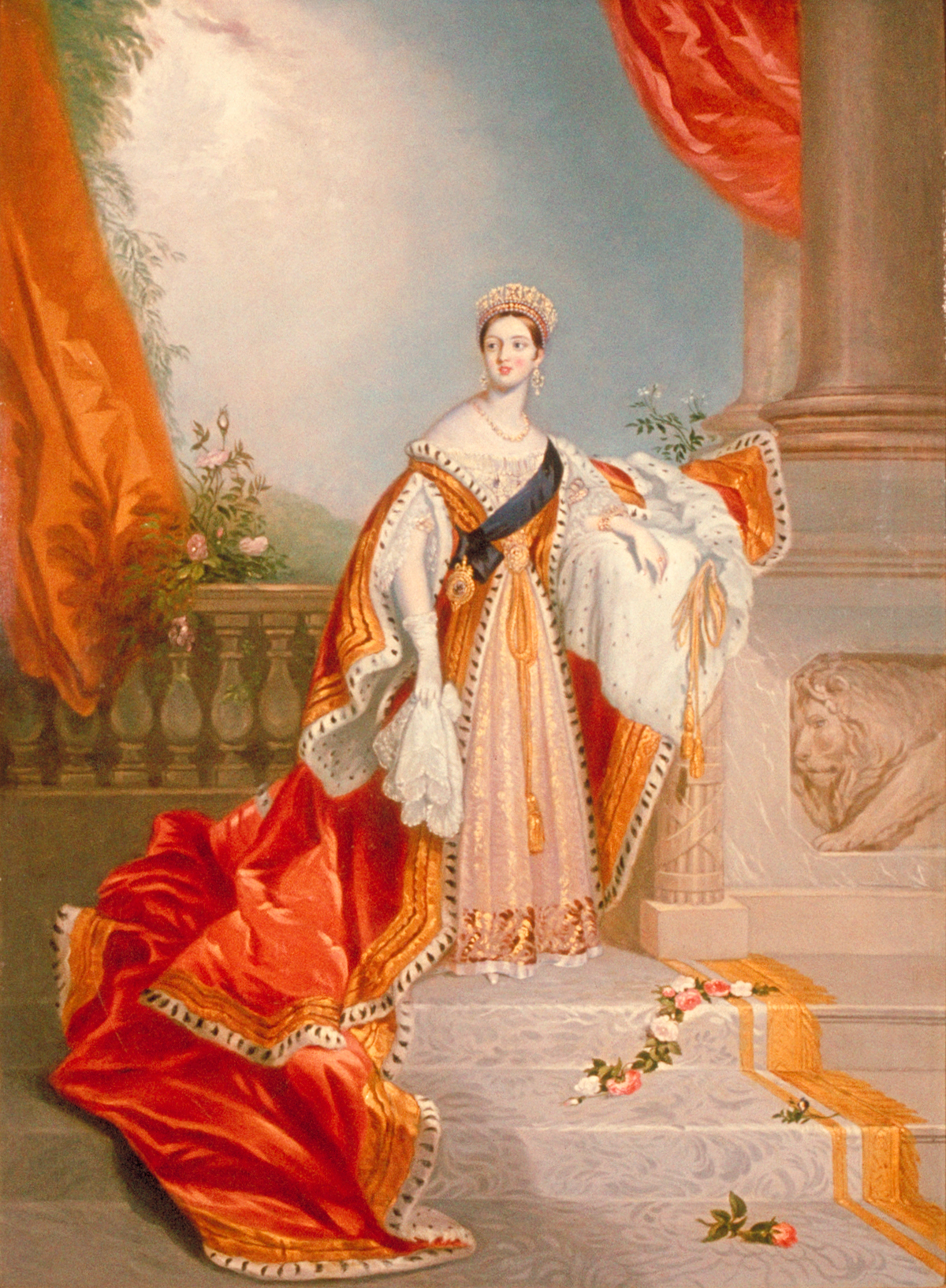
Portrait of Queen Victoria in her Robes of State, 1837 by or, more likely, after Alfred Edward Chalon

The head came from a painting by Alfred Edward Chalon, drawn for the first public appearance of Victoria as Queen on the occasion of her speech at the House of Lords where she prorogued the Parliament of the United Kingdom in July 1837. Chalon's work was intended as a gift from Victoria to her mother.

In the portrait she is wearing the George IV State Diadem, created in 1820, and the State Robes, a dress and a long royal mantle. Her body is half-turned to the right side, on top of a flight of stairs. While her head is turned to the right, her left hand holds the plinth of a column on which there is a sculpted lion.

At that time, this portrait was also known as the "Coronation portrait" because an engraving by Samuel Cousins was distributed to the public on the day of Victoria's coronation, June 28, 1838. Cousins made two versions of the engraving in several states.

=== On the stamps ===
On the stamps, which are mainly of a small size, the effigy is reproduced inside an oval that has two main forms; the oval is either large enough to see the Queen's necklace, or too small so that only the upper part of the neck is visible, but excludes the necklace.

On the New Zealand stamps the circle has a larger diameter so that the upper part of the State Robes are also visible.

The engravings for many of these stamps were produced by William Humphrys.

== History ==
=== Canada ===
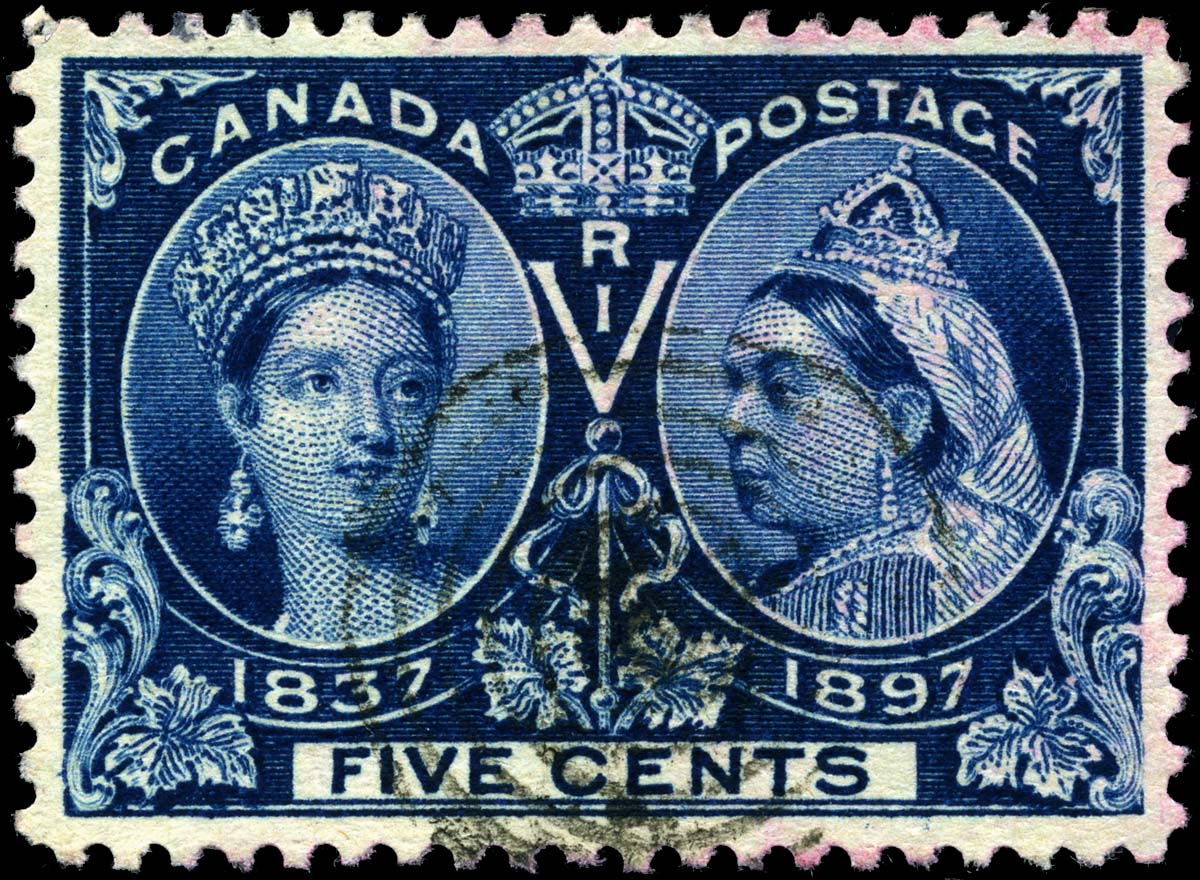
One of the stamps of Diamond Jubilee series, 1897

In 1851, the province of Canada (approximatively Ontario and Quebec) was the first colony to use the Chalon head on its first stamps. The April 9, 1851, two of the six first stamps bore this portrait: the 7 and a half pence green and the 12 pence black. After the adoption of the Canadian dollar, one additional stamp was issued in July 1859 with the Chalon head, the 12 and a half cents (with its former denomination of "SIX PENCE STERLING"). Like the previous series, these stamps were printed in New York.

Three other colonies knew Chalon head stamps before their integration to the Confederation of Canada: Nova Scotia in May 1860 (one stamp with the effigy inside a large square stamp put on its point, printed by Perkins, Bacon & Co, New Brunswick in May 1860 (three stamps printed in New York) and Prince Edward Island in June 1870 (one denomination). The last one is the only one printed in Canada, by the British-American Banknote Company.

For the Diamond Jubilee of Queen Victoria in 1897, the Confederation issued a commemorative stamp that employed the Chalon head and more recent portrait by Heinrich von Angeli.

=== New Zealand ===
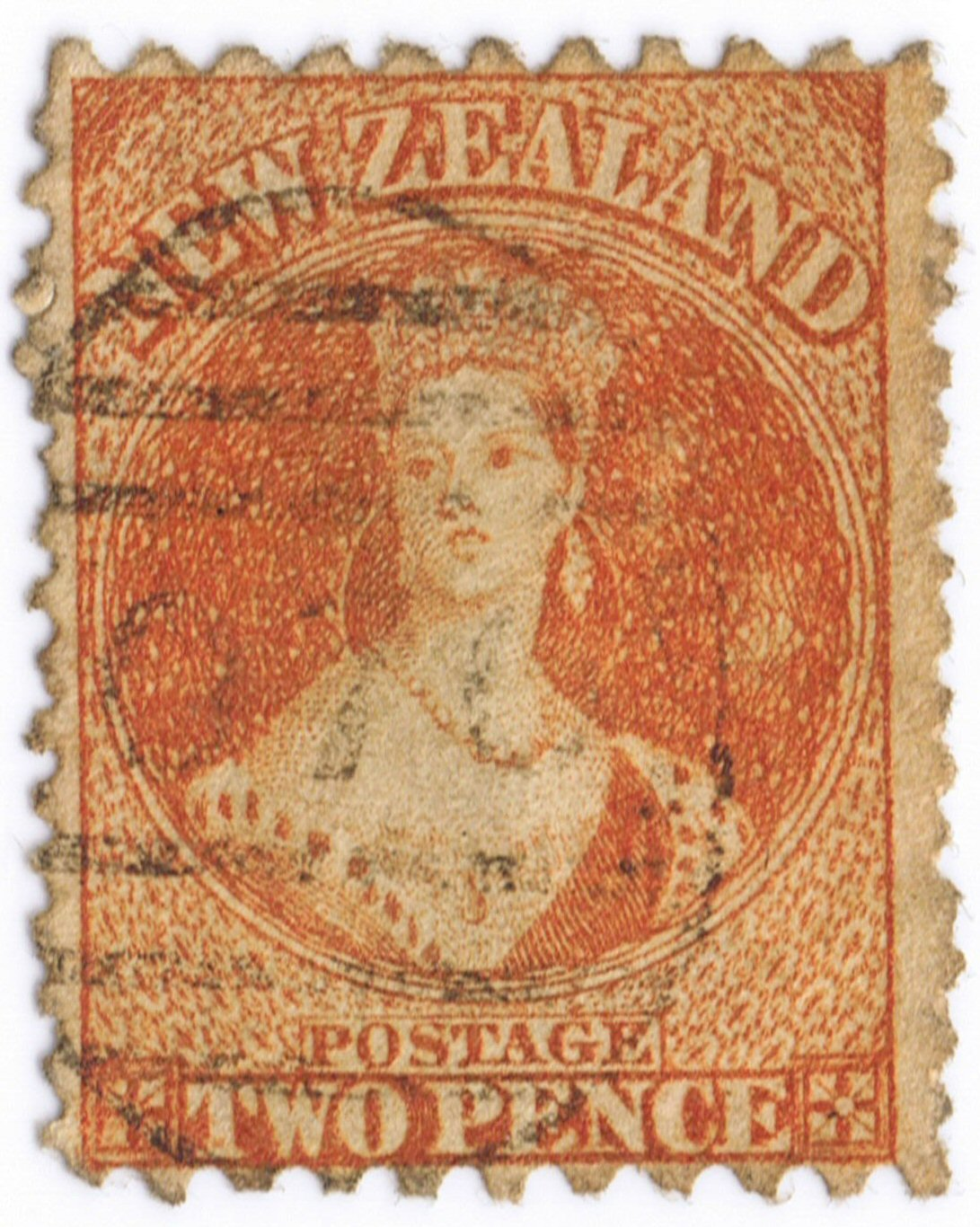
New Zealand stamp of 1871

In New Zealand the Chalon series debuted as the country's first stamps from 1855 to 1873 and Queen Victoria remained the stamps' topic until the 1898 Pictorial series. In New Zealand philately, the effigy has been called "Full Face" because the Queen appears to be almost looking forward which was rather unusual at the time when profiles were mainly used on stamps.

The one penny (carmine), two pence (blue) and one shilling (green) stamps of 1855 were initially printed in London by Perkins, Bacon & Co. These are rare and expensive (collectors should not buy without expertisation). The printing plates were shipped to New Zealand, and beginning in 1856, stamps were printed by J. Richardson in Auckland, who also printed the six pence stamp (brown) from 1858. Government postage stamp printer John Davis began printing stamps in 1862. Prepayment of postage became compulsory in New Zealand in 1862, and so the Davis prints are much more common than the other printings. The three pence stamp (mauve) was also added in 1862.

Separations appeared at the end of the 1850s. The separations were initially carried out by (or for) local postmasters, appear in many forms of perforation (points, lines or holes). The most common of the local perforations are the "perforated 13 at Dunedin" variety, appearing in 1863.

Stamps were perforated by the printers beginning in 1864. These stamps were perforated 12½ (so care is needed when identifying the Dunedin perfs!). The four pence stamp was added in 1865, initially in rose, and quickly changed to yellow. In 1871 colours were changed (1d brown, 2d orange, 6d blue).

In 1864, a scarcity of paper with the six-pointed star watermark obliged the use of paper with "NZ" watermark.

=== Tasmania ===
Van Diemen's Land used the Chalon portrait on its second issue of 1855 and again under its new name Tasmania from 1858 to 1870. The design around the portrait is uncommon compared to other Chalon series.

=== Bahamas ===
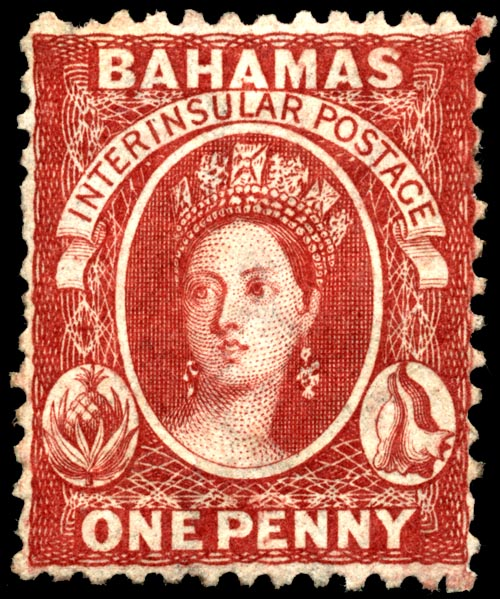
An 1863 stamp of the Bahamas

In July 1858, the governor of the Bahamas, Charles John Bayley, wanted to replace British stamps circulating on mail in the colony. In his mail to British offices, he submitted a design of a round stamp illustrated with two main productions of the islands; a pineapple and conch but, Perkins, Bacon & Co judged that such a stamp design would be too difficult to print and to perforate.

The printing company proposed a project derived from others Chalon issues: the oval of the portrait should be reduced in size and two little ovals appeared for the two Bahamian products. A banderole precised the use of the one penny stamp: "INTERINSULAR POSTAGE".

The first package of stamps printed in London were put on sale in the Bahamas the June 10, 1859. Perforations appeared in September 1860 but they were perfectly mastered by Perkins Bacon after 1863 (14 holes for 2 cm).

To replace British stamps on the mail sent to North America and the United Kingdom, two new values are issued; 4 pence rose and 6 pence grey. The pineapple and conch ovals were no longer used.

=== Queensland ===
When Queensland separated from New South Wales they issued the first stamps with a Chalon effigy in 1860 and replaced them in 1880. The Chalon head reappeared in 1882 on bigger stamps printed in intaglio or lithography, on high value stamps denominated from 2 shillings to one pound. This series was available until 1912 with the arrival of the Commonwealth of Australia stamps.

=== Natal ===
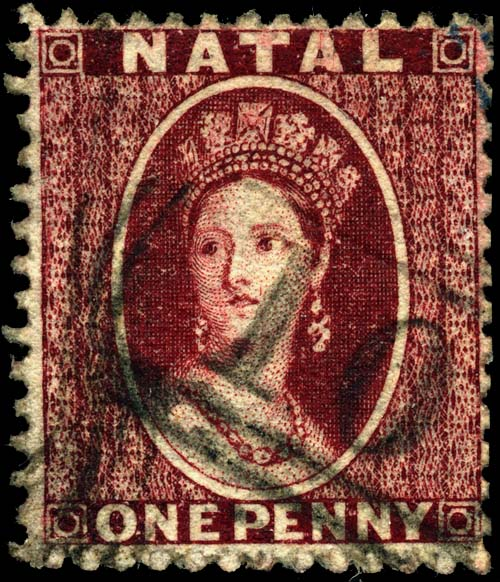
Stamp of 1863

In 1859 the Colony of Natal, in Southern Africa, replaced its embossed stamps with Chalons until 1867.

=== Grenada ===
Grenada's first postage stamps used one of the main Chalon design with the name and denomination horizontally printed relative on the top and bottom of the stamp.

On the 1859 series the necklace was visible, but on the 1875 series the effigy was placed inside a small circle that masked the Queen's neck. A new design was issued in 1883.

== Collection and studies ==
Because the stamps with the effigy inspired by Chalon's portrait are the first or one of the first stamps of these colonies, their study is well-developed by classical philatelists and 19th century postal historians.

Concerning the Bahamian Chalons, Louis E. Bradbury, treasurer of the Royal Philatelic Society London (RPSL) between 1927 and 1945, accumulated stamps, documents and correspondence between British governmental services and Perkins Bacon. After his death on 7 July 1950, his collection was received by the RPSL.

In fine and unused condition, these series are among the most priced stamps of British colonial philately. For example, in February 2006, at the auctions of Gawaine Baillie's collection, a Province of Canada 12 pence black was sold £116,000 sterling pounds and a New Zealand Chalon printed in London reached £69,000. They were the highest prices paid for single stamps from British colonies during these auctions.

== References and sources ==
Articles

- About the Bahamas issue: Negus, Ron (September 2007). "The Queen in close-up". Stamp Magazine. 73 (9): 46–48. Ron Negus, honorary archivist of the Royal Philatelic Society London, told the story of the Bahamian Chalons genesis. Some illustrations of the articles are extracted from Louis Bradbury's collection.
