= John James Chalon =

Swiss painter

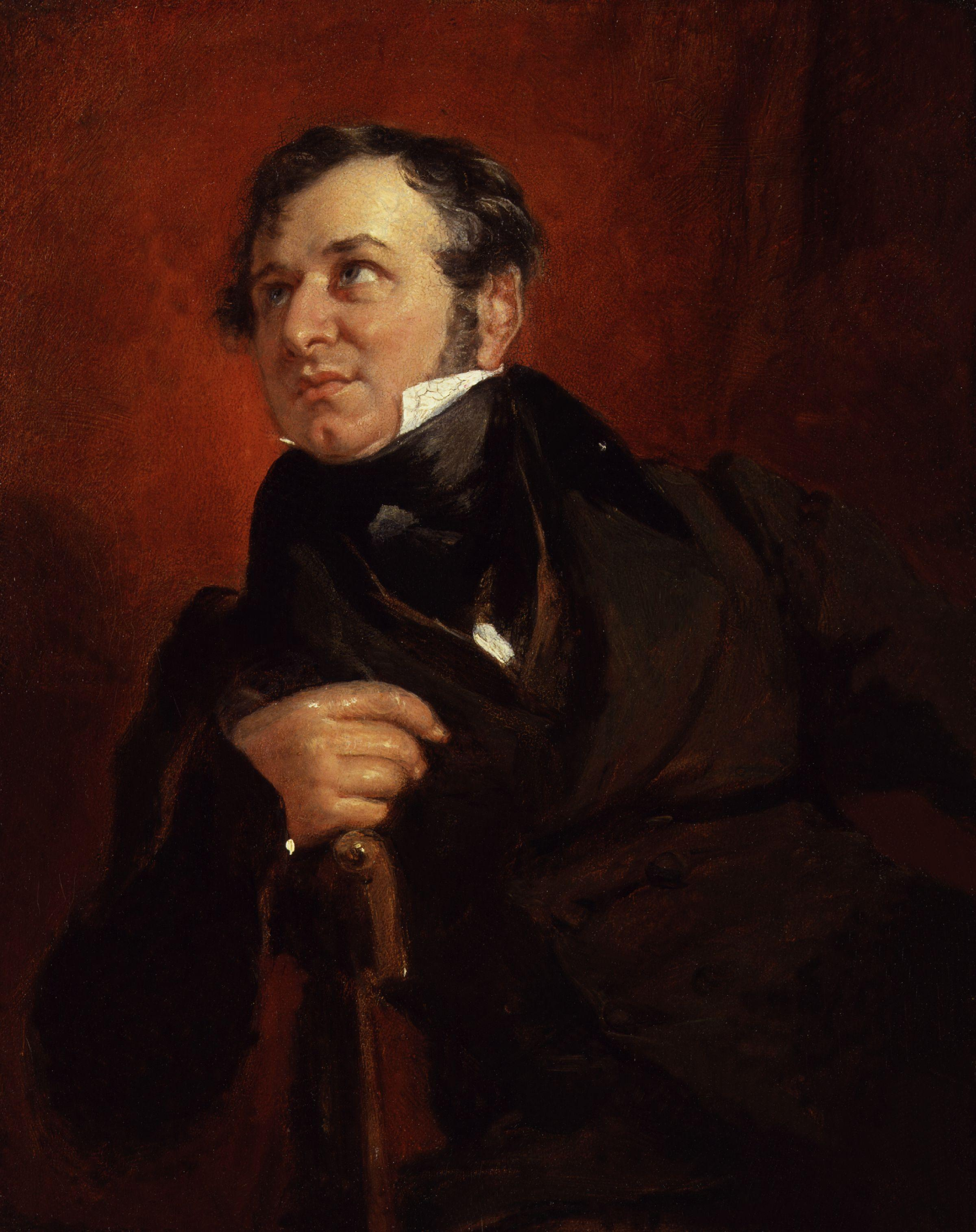
Portrait of Chalon by John Partridge, now at the National Portrait Gallery in London.

John James Chalon RA (27 March 1778 – 14 November 1854) was a Swiss painter active in England. He treated a wide range of subjects — landscapes, marine scenes, animal life, and figure-pieces.

== Life ==
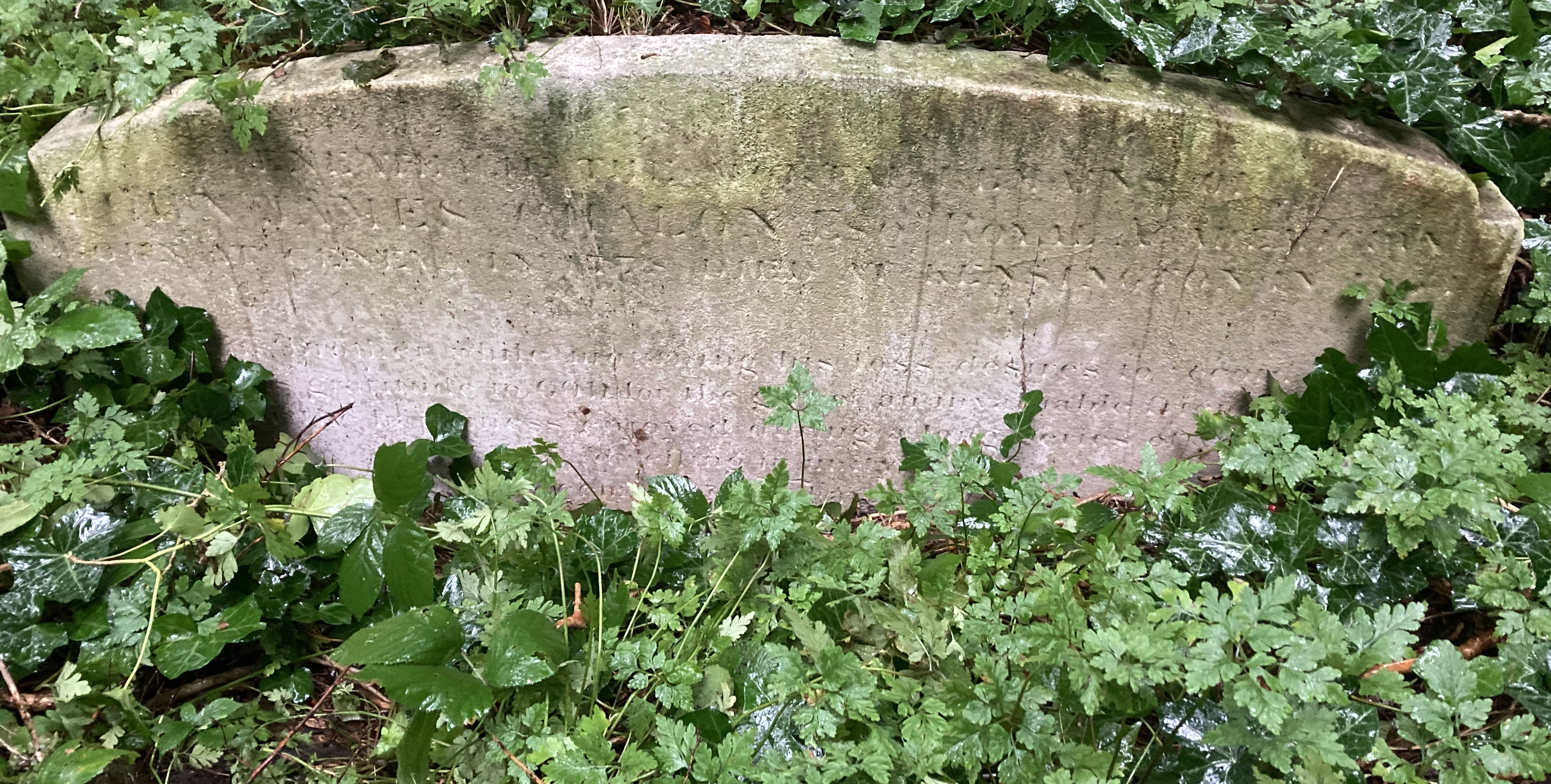
Family vault of John James Chalon in Highgate Cemetery

He was born at Geneva, of an old French family who had taken refuge there after the Revocation of the Edict of Nantes. He went to England when quite young, and entered the Schools of the Academy in 1796. His first picture, 'Banditti at their Repast,' appeared in 1800. In 1808, he, his brother Alfred Edward Chalon, and some friends, founded the Sketching Society, and in the same year he joined the Water-Colour Society, but in 1813 he seceded from it, and again devoted himself to painting pictures in oil for the Royal Academy. He was elected an Associate of that institution in 1827, and an Academician in 1841.

In 1847 he was seized by an attack of paralysis, and, after a long and painful illness, died at Kensington in 1854. He is buried in a family vault (plot no.6179) on the western side of Highgate Cemetery.

== Works ==
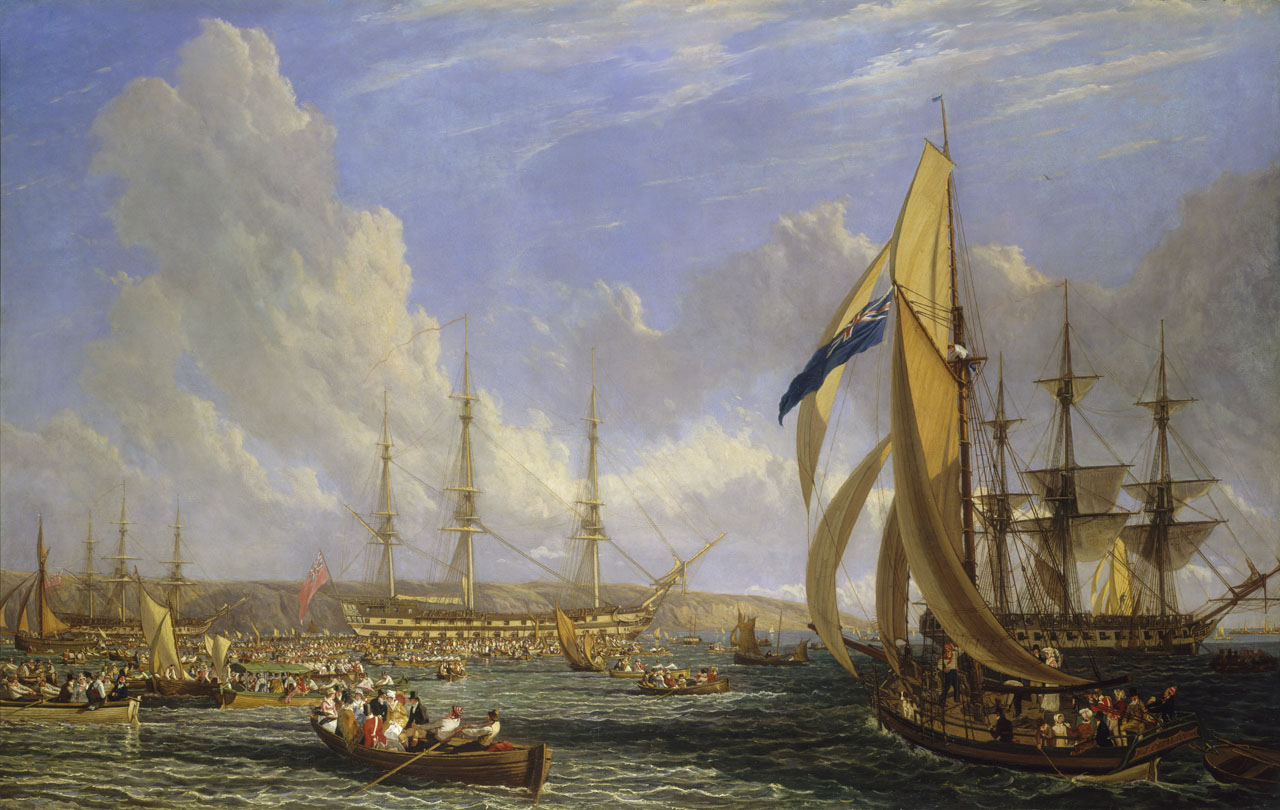
Napoleon on board the Bellerophon, 1816, now at the National Maritime Museum in Greenwich.

In 1820 Chalon published a series of Sketches from Parisian Manners.

He often made art depicting Switzerland, the land of his father and mother, and some of his landscapes are representations of its mountains and lakes. Among these, is the work 'Castle of Chillon,' its lonely white walls strongly contrasting with the dark mountains that rise behind them, and glittering in the ripple of the clear blue lake. Amongst his later productions were 'Gil Blas in the Robbers' Cave,' in 1843, and the 'Arrival of the Steamer at Folkestone,' in 1844. The Gallery of the Old Royal Naval College, Greenwich, possesses his 'Napoleon on board the Bellerophon,' painted in 1816, and in the Sheepshanks Collection at the South Kensington Museum are 'Village Gossips,' painted in 1815, and 'Hastings, Fishing Boat's making the Shore in a Breeze,' painted in 1819.
