= Alfred Edward Chalon =

Swiss-born British portrait painter (1780–1860)

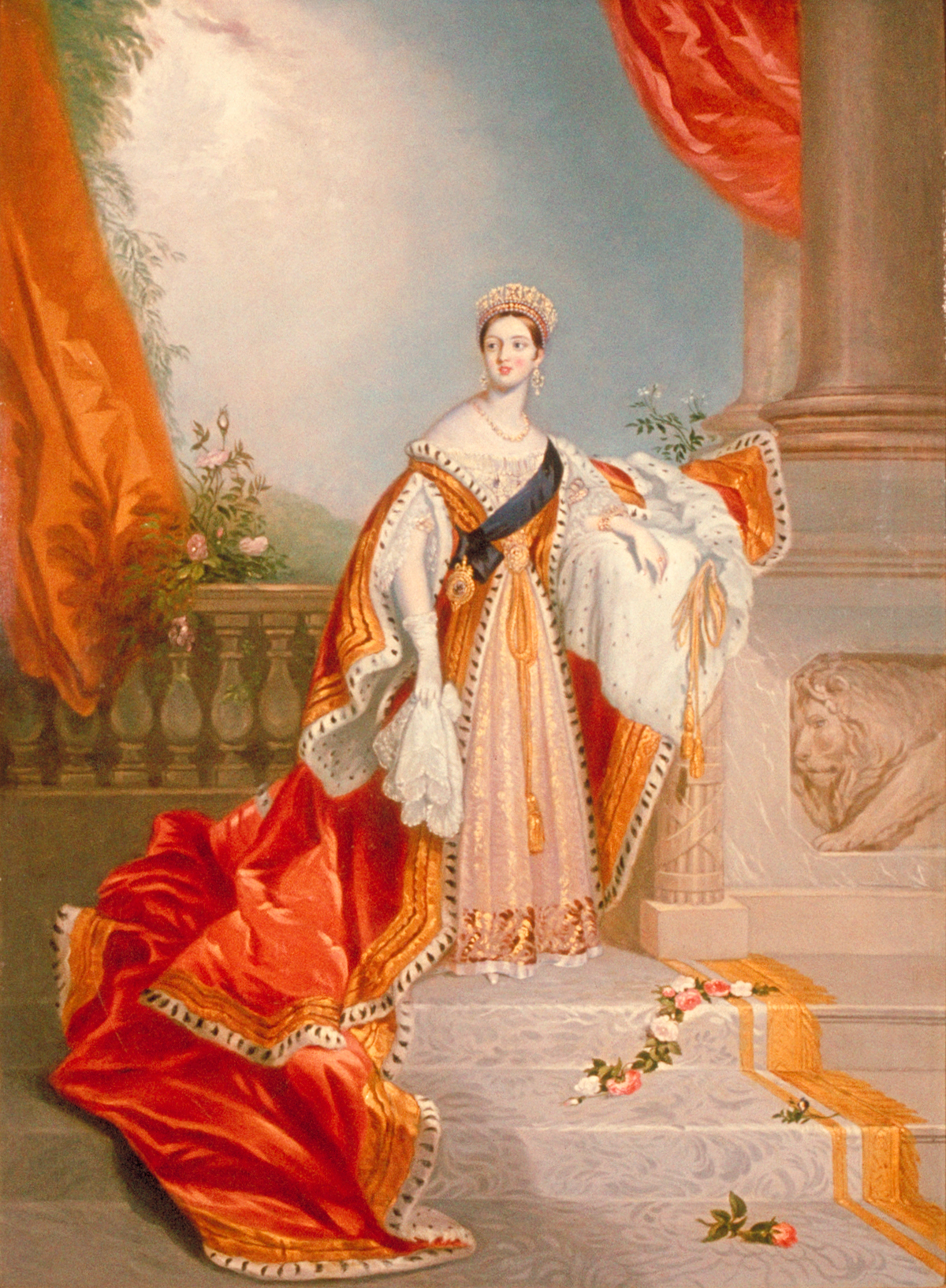
An original or, more likely, a copy of Chalon's portrait of Queen Victoria

Alfred Edward Chalon RA (15 February 1780 – 3 October 1860) was a Swiss-born British portraitist. He lived in London where he was noticed by Queen Victoria.

== Biography ==
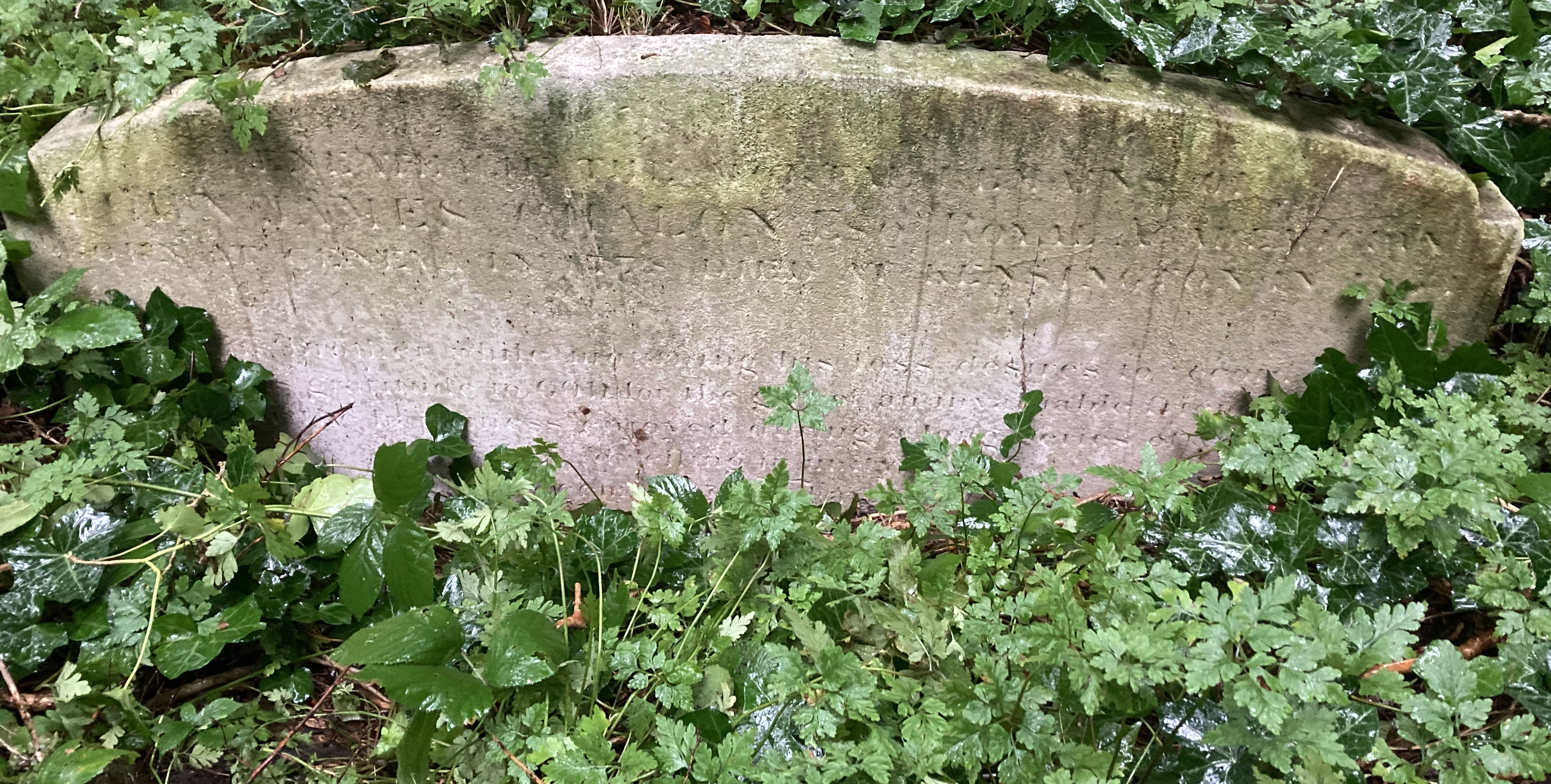
The Chalon family vault in Highgate Cemetery

Alfred Chalon was born in Geneva from a father who soon was hired as professor at the Royal Military College, Sandhurst, in England.

With his brother John James Chalon (1778–1854), Alfred became an artist. Entered at the Royal Academy in 1797, he joined the Associated Artists in Water-Colours, a group of aquarellists. In the Academy, he was elected an associate (ARA) in 1812, then academician (RA) in 1816.

Known for his portraits of the good society of London, he was chosen by Queen Victoria to paint a gift to her mother: Victoria in her State robes going to the House of Lords for her first official act, the prorogation of the Parliament, on 17 July 1837. After this task, Chalon was entitled Portrait Painter in Water Colour to Her Majesty and gained some celebrity. His 1837 portrait was engraved by Samuel Cousins and distributed to the public the day of Victoria's coronation, the 28 June 1838; and the next year Cousins produced a second, smaller, engraving. Then, starting in 1851, the "Chalon head" appeared on some British colonies' postage stamps.

Bachelors, the Chalon brothers lived together. In 1860, Alfred died at Campden Hill, in Kensington, London and was buried with his brother in Highgate Cemetery.

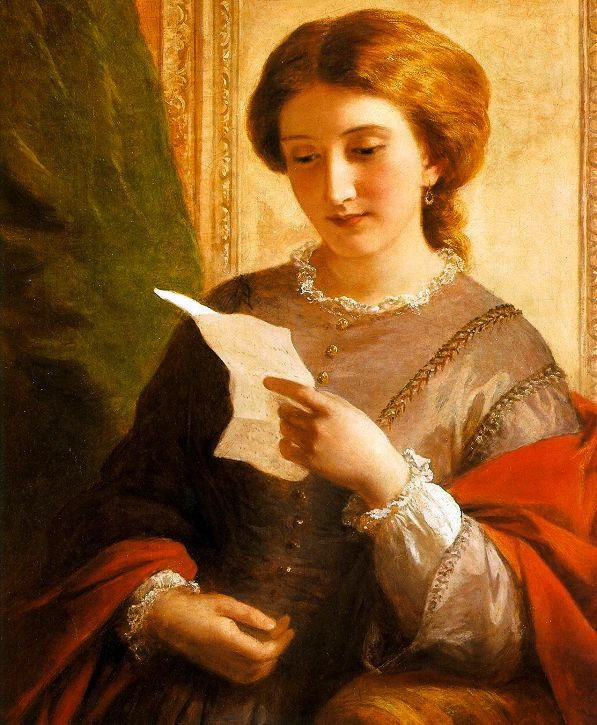
Girl Reading Letter
