= Leaghur State Park =

- IUCN category II (national park)
- Location within Victoria
- Location: Victoria
- Nearest city: Kerang
- Coordinates: 35°55′S 143°48′E
- Area: 20.22 km^{2} (7.81 sq mi)
- Established: 1992
- Governing body: Parks Victoria
- Website: Official website

Leaghur State Park is a 2,022-hectare (5,000-acre) state park located in Leaghur, approximately 25 kilometres (16 mi) south-west of Kerang, in Victoria, Australia. The Park protects some of the most significant black box (Eucalyptus largiflorens) wetlands and woodlands in Victoria. The Park is part of the Loddon River floodplain and is frequently flooded, creating ephemeral wetlands and different age classes in the black box stands. It was opened in 1992.
