= Chalon, Isère =

Chalon
- Commune
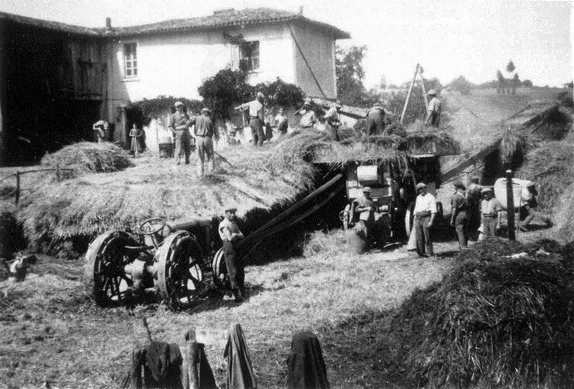
- Chalon in 1933
- Location of Chalon
- Location within France Location within Auvergne-Rhône-Alpes
- Coordinates: 45°27′18″N 4°56′10″E
- Country: France
- Region: Auvergne-Rhône-Alpes
- Department: Isère
- Arrondissement: Vienne
- Canton: Roussillon

Government
  - Mayor (2020–2026): Élisabeth Tyrode
- Area^{1}: 5.20 km^{2} (2.01 sq mi)
- Highest elevation: 428 m (1,404 ft)
- Lowest elevation: 297 m (974 ft)
- Population (2023): 176
  - Density: 33.8/km^{2} (87.7/sq mi)
- Time zone: UTC+01:00 (CET)
  - Summer (DST): UTC+02:00 (CEST)
- INSEE/Postal code: 38066 /38122
- ^{1} French Land Register data, which excludes lakes, ponds, glaciers > 1 km^{2} (0.386 sq mi or 247 acres) and river estuaries.

Chalon (French pronunciation: [ʃalɔ̃], before 2012: Châlons) is a commune in the Isère department in southeastern France.

== Population ==
Historical population
Year	Pop.	±% p.a.
1968	55	—
1975	61	+1.49%
1982	134	+11.90%
1990	163	+2.48%
1999	162	−0.07%
2007	153	−0.71%
2012	167	+1.77%
2017	180	+1.51%
2023	176	−0.37%
Source: INSEE

== See also ==
- Communes of the Isère department
